= Going to Work =

1943 painting by L. S. Lowry

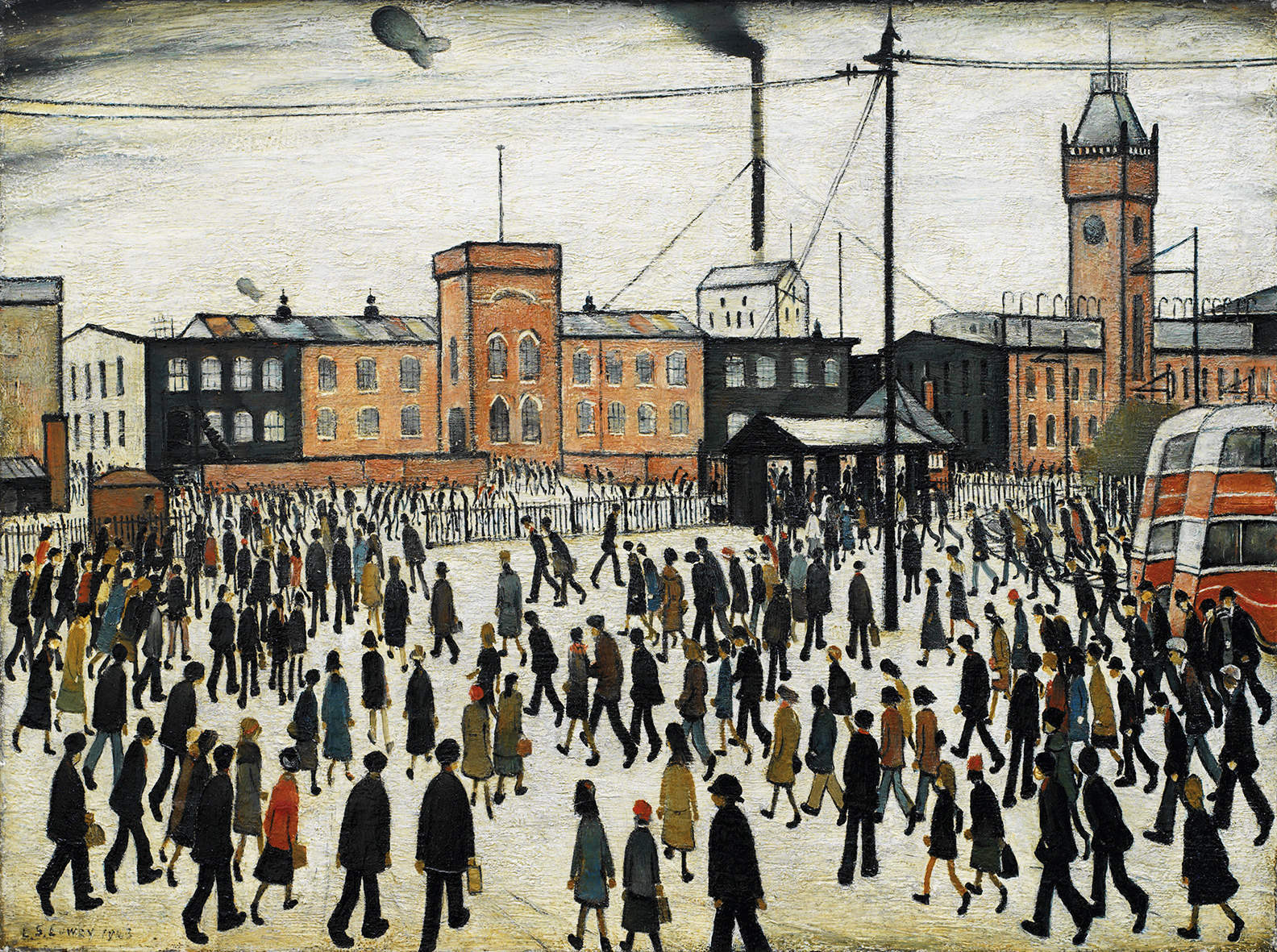
- Artist: L. S. Lowry
- Year: 1943
- Medium: Oil on canvas
- Movement: Naïve art
- Dimensions: 45.7 cm × 60.9 cm (18 in × 24 in)
- Location: Imperial War Museum North, Manchester
- Accession: Art.IWM ART LD 3074
- Website: www.iwm.org.uk/collections/item/object/17026

Going to Work is a 1943 oil painting by the English artist L. S. Lowry.

Originally commissioned as a piece of war art by the War Artists Advisory Committee, it depicts crowds of workers walking into the Mather & Platt engineering equipment factory in Manchester, north-west England. The painting now hangs in the Imperial War Museum North.

== Description ==
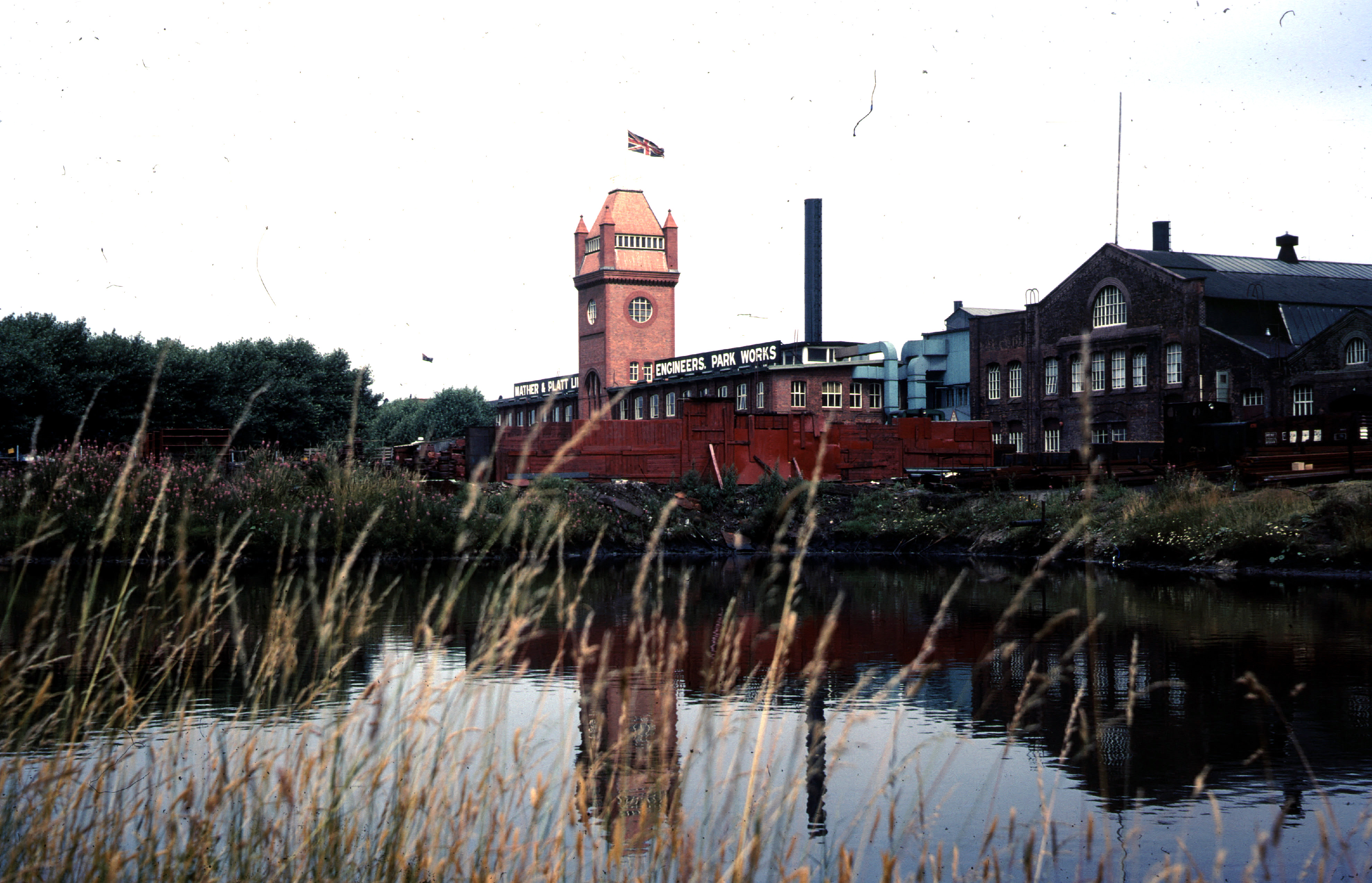
Part of the Mather & Platt engineering works in Manchester is represented in Going to Work

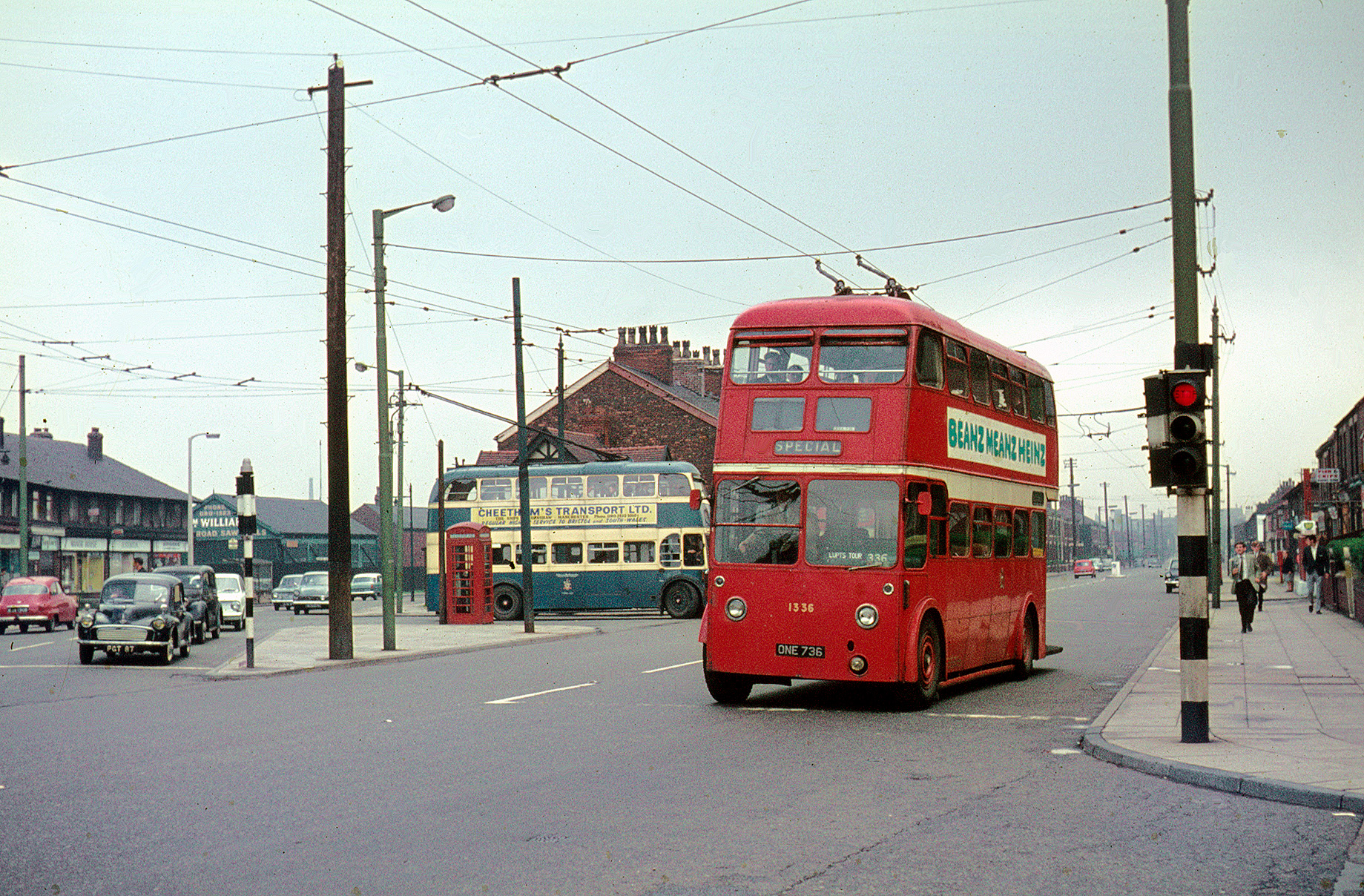
Manchester Corporation buses (or trolleybuses) are visible in the painting

Going to Work presents a grey, industrial scene of hundreds of factory workers walking towards the Mather & Platt engineering works at Newton Heath in Manchester. The crowds of workers are painted in Lowry's characteristic style as "matchstalk" figures, all walking in a uniform direction towards the focal point of the factory gate to the left of the picture. Beyond the gate, the figures continue filing into an array of ancillary factory buildings. In the background can be seen the turret of the Mather building, and in the foreground, the ends of a pair of red Manchester Corporation buses protrude into the field of view. Distant barrage balloons fly above the factory buildings.

The pale-coloured ground was previously thought to represent a layer of snow, but art historians now consider this to be an evocation of industrial haze.

The painting is signed in the bottom-left corner "L.S.LOWRY 1943".

== History ==
External videos
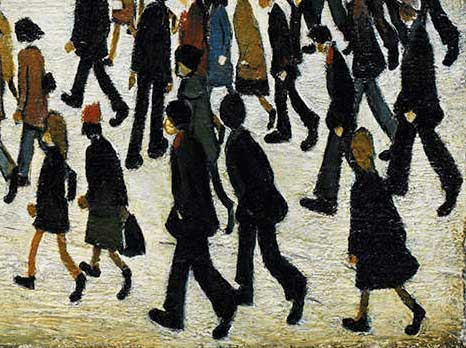
- IWM North video about restoring Going to Work

Lowry painted the scene during a period of reduced artistic activity in his life. The death of his mother in 1939 took a heavy emotional toll on him, and Lowry produced little during the war. Despite living through two world wars, Lowry was not noted as a prolific war artist. During World War II, he served as a fire watcher in Manchester and produced a small number of paintings in the 1940s capturing the aftermath of the Manchester Blitz, among them After the Blitz and Blitzed Site, but other works of this time bear no visual evidence of wartime activity.

Going to Work was commissioned in 1943 by the War Artists' Advisory Committee (WAAC) as part of an initiative to create a visual record of Britain during the years of World War II. The project involved a body of work by over 400 official war artists who captured scenes of the war effort.

The WAAC wanted to reflect the important role of heavy industry in the war effort, and so Lowry's contribution was a scene of workers going into an engineering factory. He was paid 25 guineas for the commission and it was completed in three months. Allen Andrews notes that Going to Work is a typical example of a Lowry industrial scene, and that there is nothing in Lowry's image to distinguish it as "war art" except for the addition of a pair of barrage balloons, inflatable objects that were used to deter enemy bombers during air raids.

When the painting was finished, it was displayed in a number of exhibitions in Britain and internationally. After World War II, Going to Work was given to the collection of the Imperial War Museum and was held in storage in London for many years. It was exhibited at the Royal Academy in 1976. In 2019 the piece was brought out of storage and underwent restoration. It is now on public display in the Imperial War Museum North, alongside works by other artists such as Flora Lion and Anna Airy.

Another watercolour piece by Lowry of the same title was painted in 1959. It depicts a similar scene to his 1943 oil painting, with crowds of workers filing into factory buildings, and the two works have some common architectural elements. Formerly held in the collection of Salford Museum and Art Gallery, the watercolour is now on public display in The Lowry at Salford Quays.

The Mather & Platt works depicted in Lowry's painting were built in 1900 and stood for many years after the war. The factory continued in operation until it finally closed in 2019. The factory buildings have since been demolished.
