= Imperial War Museum North =

Museum in Manchester, England

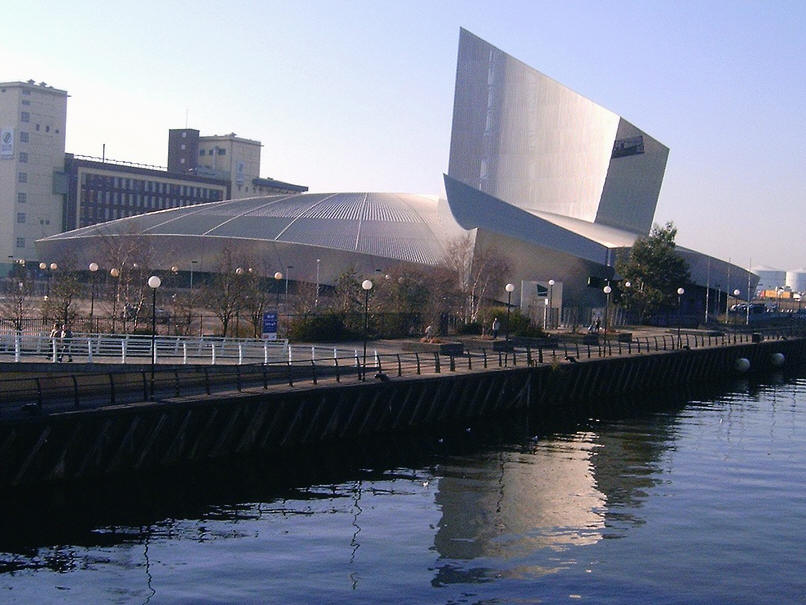
- Established: 5 July 2002
- Location: The Quays; Trafford Wharf Road; Trafford Park; Greater Manchester; England
- Coordinates: 53.4697°N 2.2989°W
- Type: War museum
- Visitors: 259,349 (2025)
- Public transit access: Imperial War Museum
- Website: iwm.org.uk/visits/iwm-north

Imperial War Museums
- Churchill War Rooms; HMS Belfast; IWM Duxford; IWM London; IWM North

Imperial War Museum North (sometimes referred to as IWM North) is a museum in the Metropolitan Borough of Trafford in Greater Manchester, England. One of five branches of the Imperial War Museum, it explores the impact of modern conflicts on people and society. It is the first branch of the Imperial War Museum to be located in the north of England. The museum occupies a site overlooking the Manchester Ship Canal on Trafford Wharf Road, Trafford Park, an area which during World War II was a key industrial centre and consequently heavily bombed during the Manchester Blitz in 1940. The area is now home to the Lowry cultural centre and the MediaCityUK development, which stand opposite the museum at Salford Quays.

The museum building was designed by architect Daniel Libeskind and opened in July 2002, receiving 470,000 visitors in its first year of opening. It was recognised with awards or prize nominations for its architecture and is a prime example of Deconstructivist architecture. The museum features a permanent exhibition of chronological and thematic displays, supported by hourly audiovisual presentations which are projected throughout the gallery space. The museum also hosts a programme of temporary exhibitions in a separate gallery. Since opening, the museum has operated a successful volunteer programme, which since January 2007 has been run in partnership with Manchester Museum. As part of a national museum, Imperial War Museum North is financed by the Department for Culture, Media and Sport and by self-generated income. Admission is free.

== Planning and construction ==
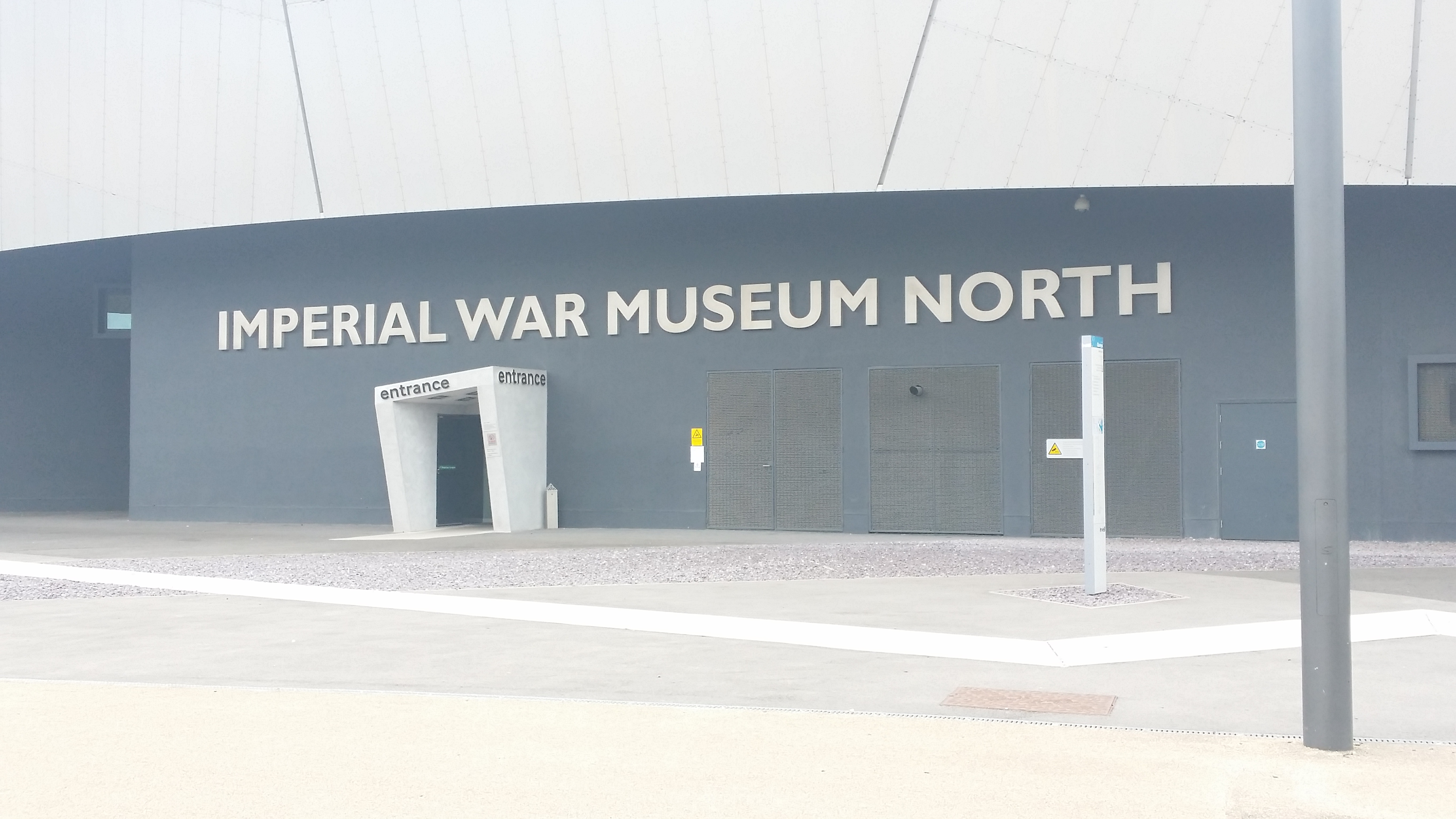
The entrance

During the 1990s, the Imperial War Museum sought to open a branch in the north of England. Seventy-one sites were offered for consideration by 36 local councils. One such council was that of Hartlepool, in County Durham, for whom a new museum building was designed by architect Sir Norman Foster for a site on Hartlepool's dockside. In 1992 the Teesside Development Corporation offered the museum, on behalf of Hartlepool council, a total of £14.4 million towards construction and running costs. However, the National Audit Office later reported that the corporation's offer breached government rules and negotiations were abandoned.

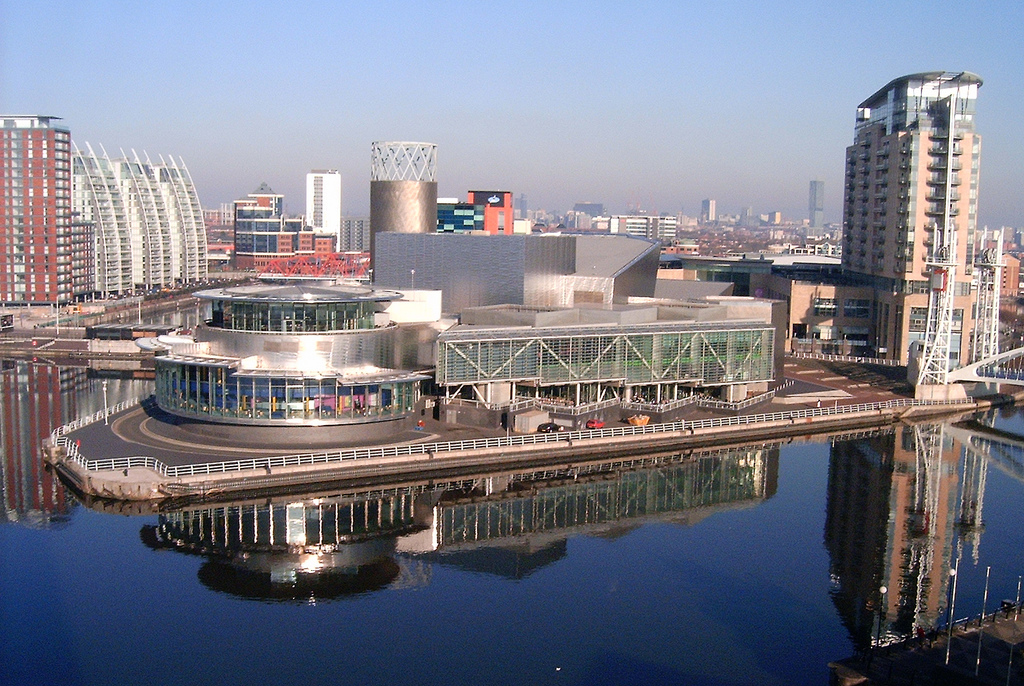
View from the museum's air shard viewing platform; The Lowry opposite the museum in Salford, across the Manchester Ship Canal.

In January 1999 the then Culture Secretary Chris Smith launched a project to construct the new museum in Trafford, Greater Manchester. The Trafford Park area has strong associations with the Second World War on the British home front; factories in the area produced Avro Lancaster heavy bombers, and Rolls-Royce Merlin aero engines used by a number of Royal Air Force combat aircraft. By 1945 the area employed 75,000 people. The area was consequently heavily bombed, particularly during the Manchester Blitz, when 684 people were killed in raids over two nights in December 1940. By the time of Chris Smith's announcement, the museum had already received outline planning permission (in October 1997), with full approval in April 1999.

=== Architecture ===
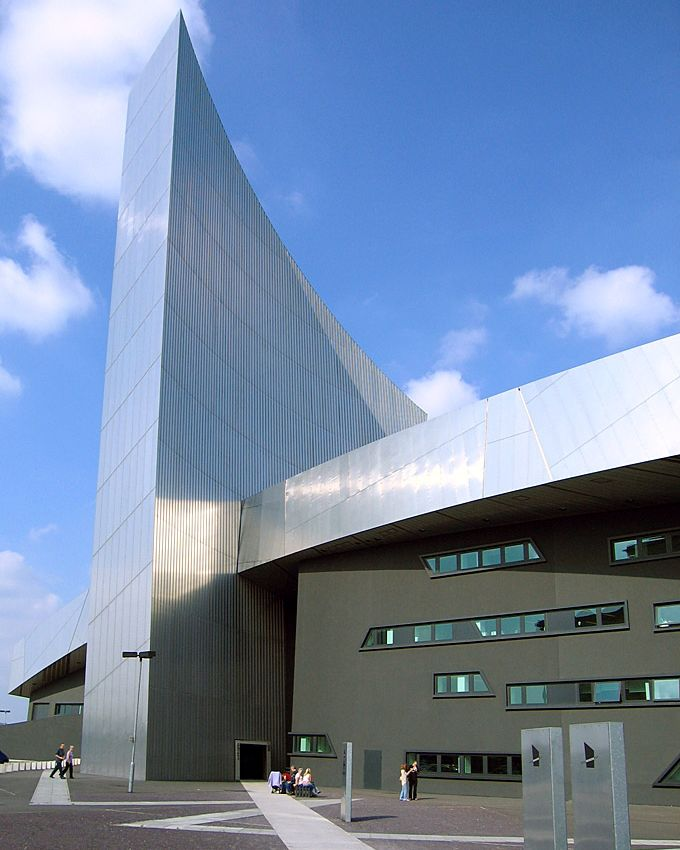
The entrance to Imperial War Museum North, at the base of the air shard tower.

An architectural competition for the new museum was held in 1997, with the winning design being that of Berlin-based architect Daniel Libeskind. Born in Łódź, Poland, in 1946, Libeskind's family had suffered during World War II and dozens of his relatives were murdered in The Holocaust. It was his first building in the United Kingdom. At the museum's opening, Libeskind said that he sought to "create a building ... which emotionally moved the soul of the visitor toward a sometimes unexpected realization"'. Libeskind envisaged a 'constellation composed of three interlocking shards' with each shard being a remnant of an imagined globe shattered by conflict. These shards in turn represented air, earth and water, and each formed a functionally distinct part of the museum. The 55 m high air shard, provides the museum's entranceway and a viewing balcony (now closed to the public) above the Manchester Ship Canal with views of the Manchester skyline. The construction of the tower leaves viewers exposed to the elements and one reviewer considered that it reflected "the aerial perspective of modern warfare and the precariousness of the life below". The earth shard houses the museum's exhibition spaces, while the water shard accommodates a cafe with views of the canal.

Originally budgeted at £40 million, the museum was eventually completed for £28.5 million after anticipated National Lottery funding was not forthcoming. The museum was funded by local, national and European development agencies. The European Union's European Regional Development Fund contributed £8.9 million, English Partnerships and the Northwest Regional Development Agency £2.7 million, and £2.8 million was provided by Trafford Metropolitan Borough Council. The Peel Group, a local transport and property company, contributed £12.5 million; this was reportedly the largest single sum ever given to a UK cultural project by a private enterprise. The reduction in budget forced a number of changes; the substitution of metal for concrete in the construction of the shards, the removal of a planned auditorium, and a change of exhibition content. The site's external landscaping also had to be reduced; in 2009, following an architectural design competition managed by RIBA Competitions, Berlin-based company Topotek 1 were appointed to complete this landscaping. Despite these economies, the fundamental "shattered globe" concept remained intact. A final £3 million was raised by a fundraising campaign led by BBC News war correspondent Kate Adie. Construction of the museum, by structural engineers Arup and main contractor Sir Robert McAlpine, began on 5 January 2000 and the building was topped out in late September that year. Exhibition fitting started in November 2001, and the museum opened to the public on 5 July 2002, shortly before the 2002 Commonwealth Games which were hosted in Manchester that year.

== Exhibitions ==
Permanent exhibitions are housed in the museum's first-floor main gallery space within the earth shard. These consist of a chronological display which runs around the gallery's 200-metre (660 ft) perimeter and six thematic displays in "silos" within the space. As part of the earth shard, the 3,500 m^{2} floor of the gallery is curved, gradually dropping away like the curvature of the Earth from a nominal "North Pole" near the gallery's entrance. Within this hall, described as cavernous and dramatic, a number of large artefacts are displayed; they include a Russian T-34 tank, a United States Marine Corps AV-8A Harrier jet and a 13-pounder field gun which fired the British Army's first shot of World War I. Around the gallery, a number of vertical mechanical conveyors called "timestacks" display selections of smaller artefacts, some of which can be handled by visitors. Libeskind's subsequent work on the masterplan for renewal the World Trade Centre site is echoed in the exhibit of a 7 m (23 ft) section of twisted steel from that building.

Objects in the IWM north collection

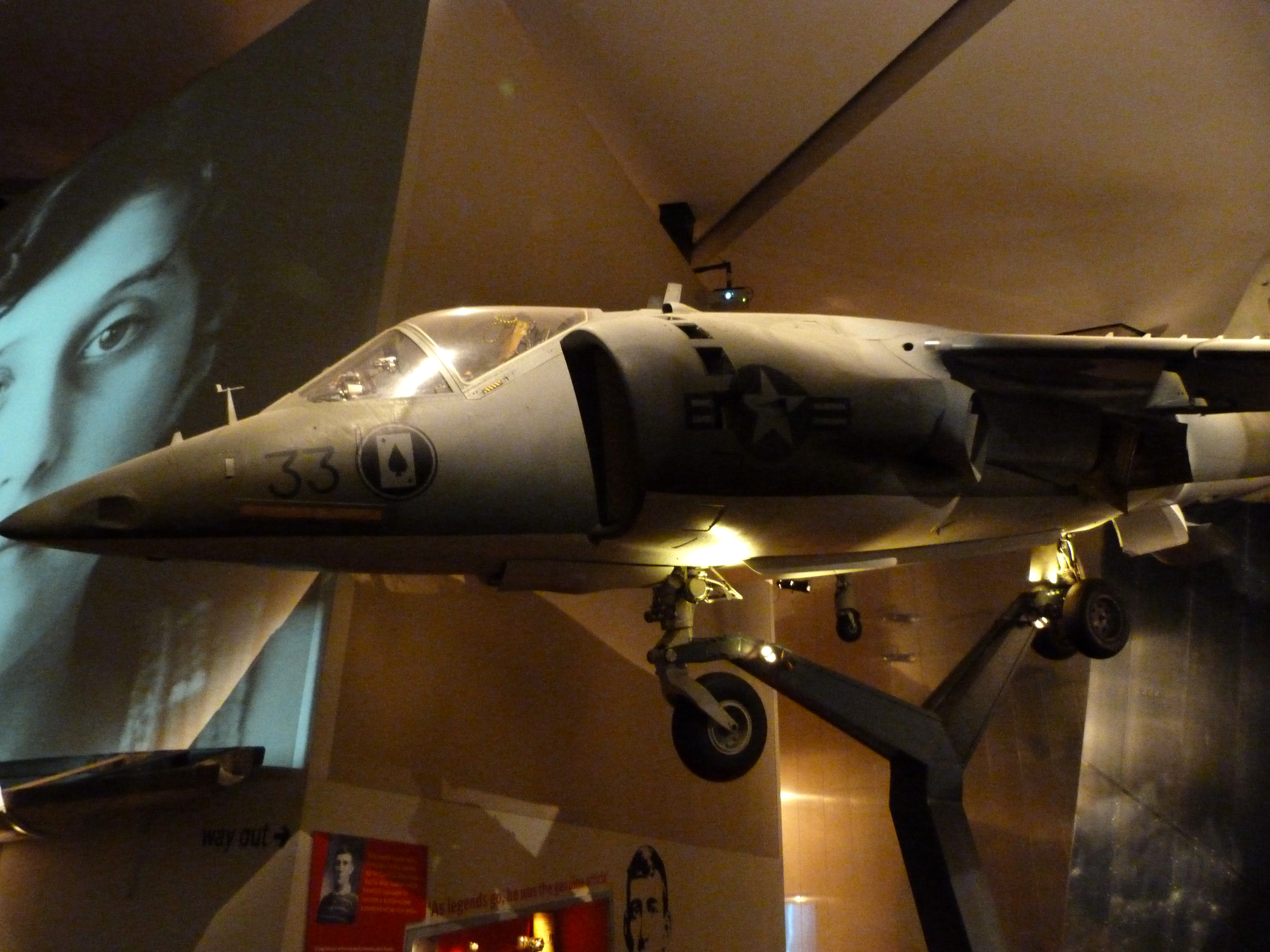
AV-8A Harrier

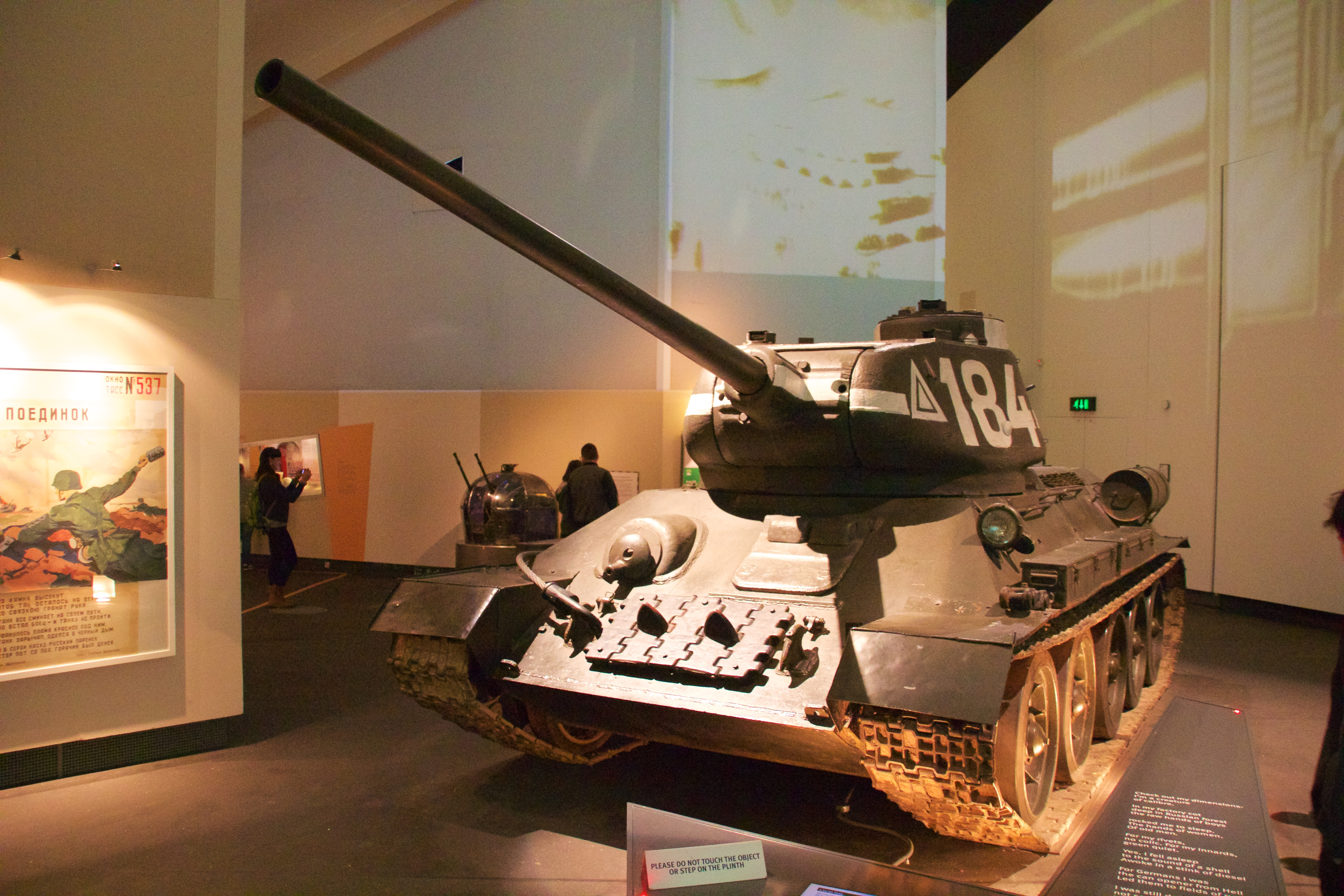
A Soviet T-34 tank

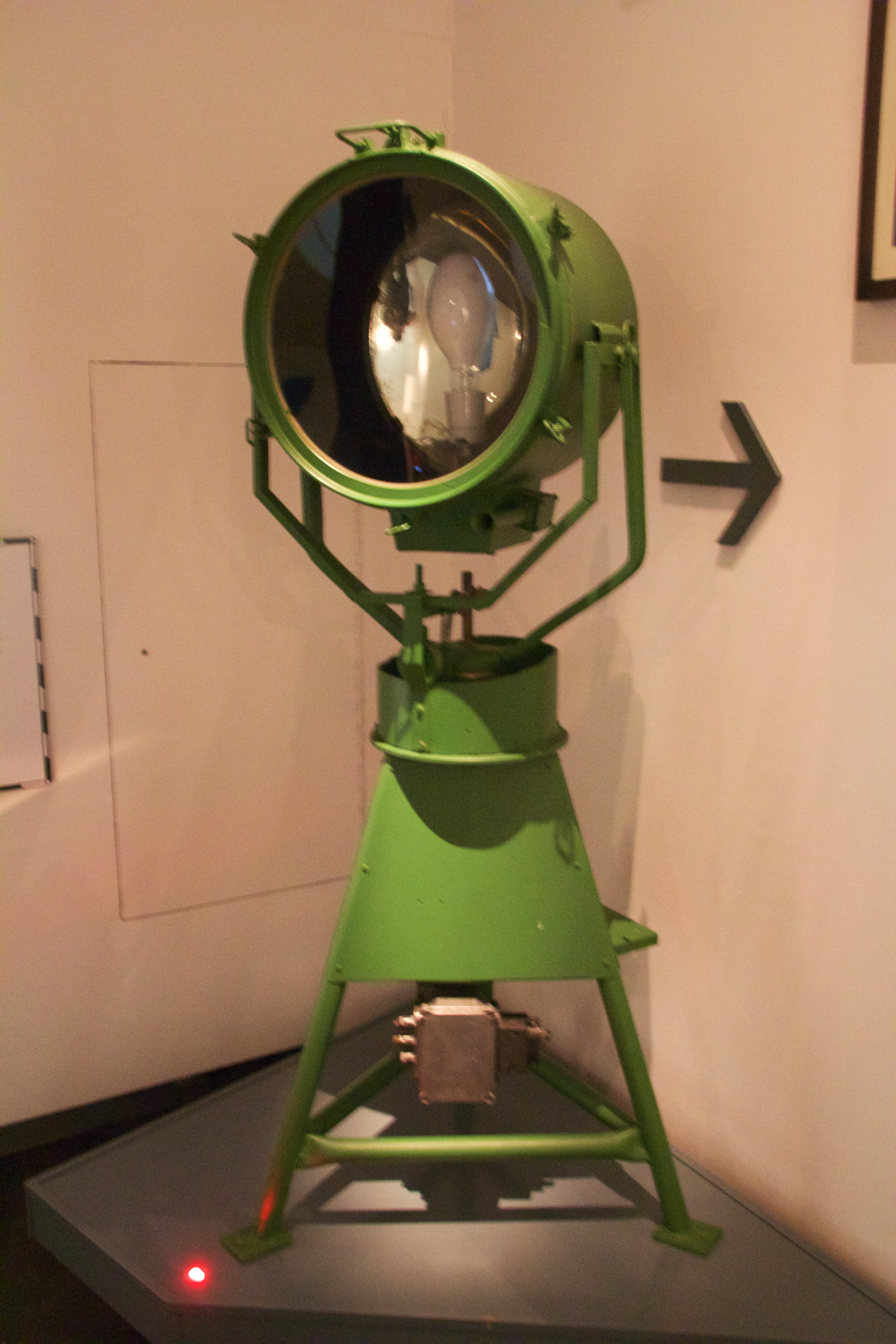
Berlin Wall searchlight

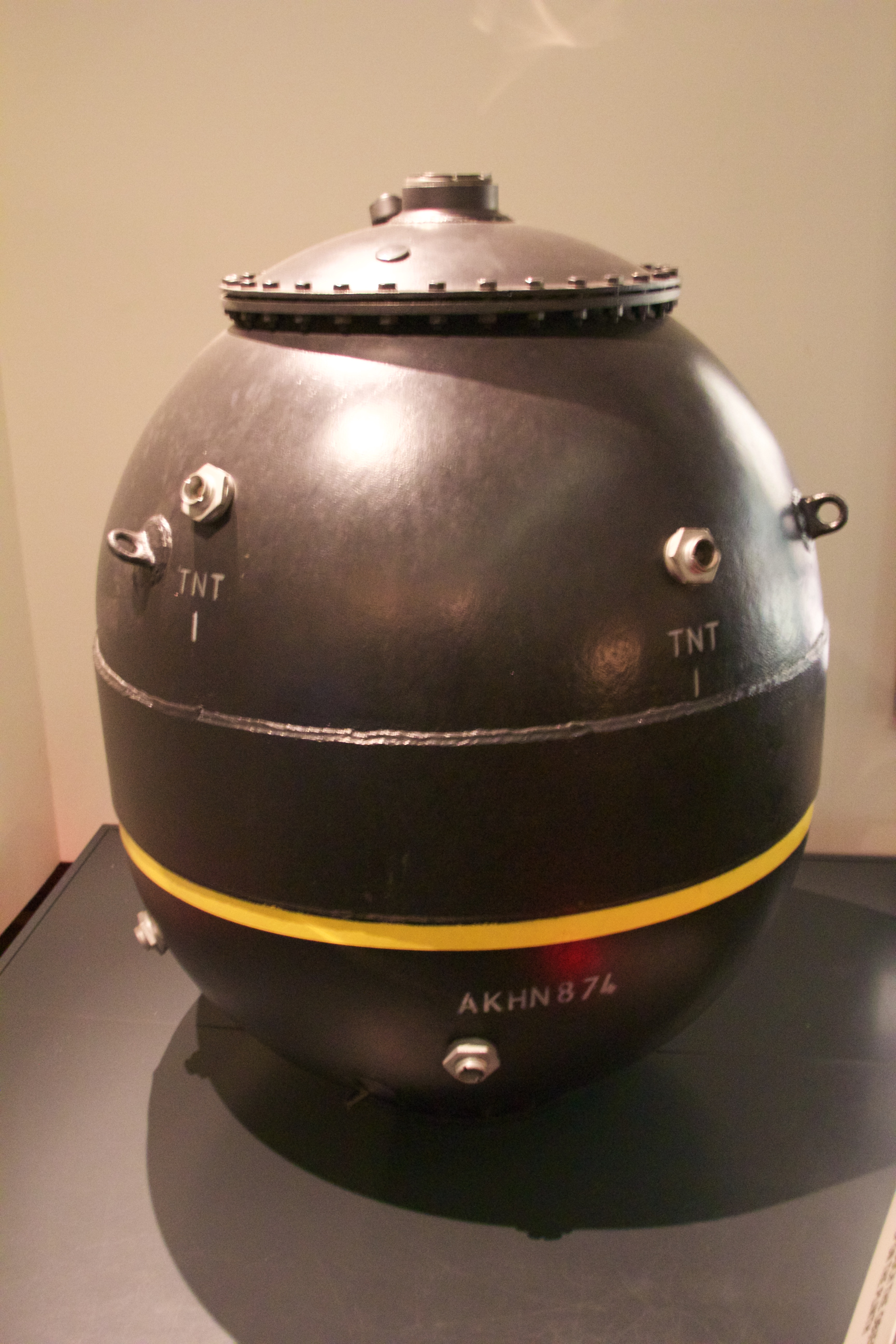
Mk XVII contact sea mine

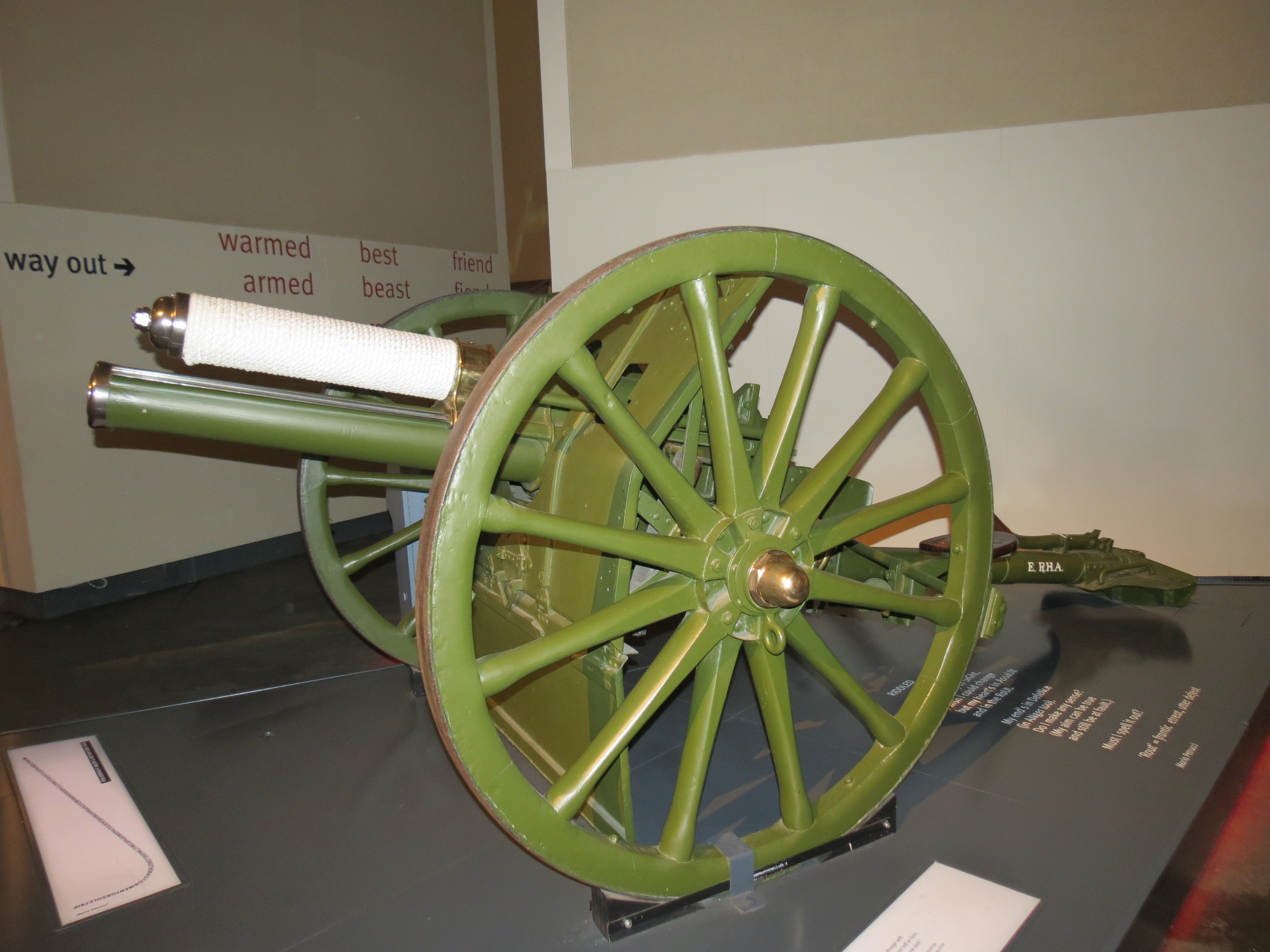
QF 13-pounder field gun

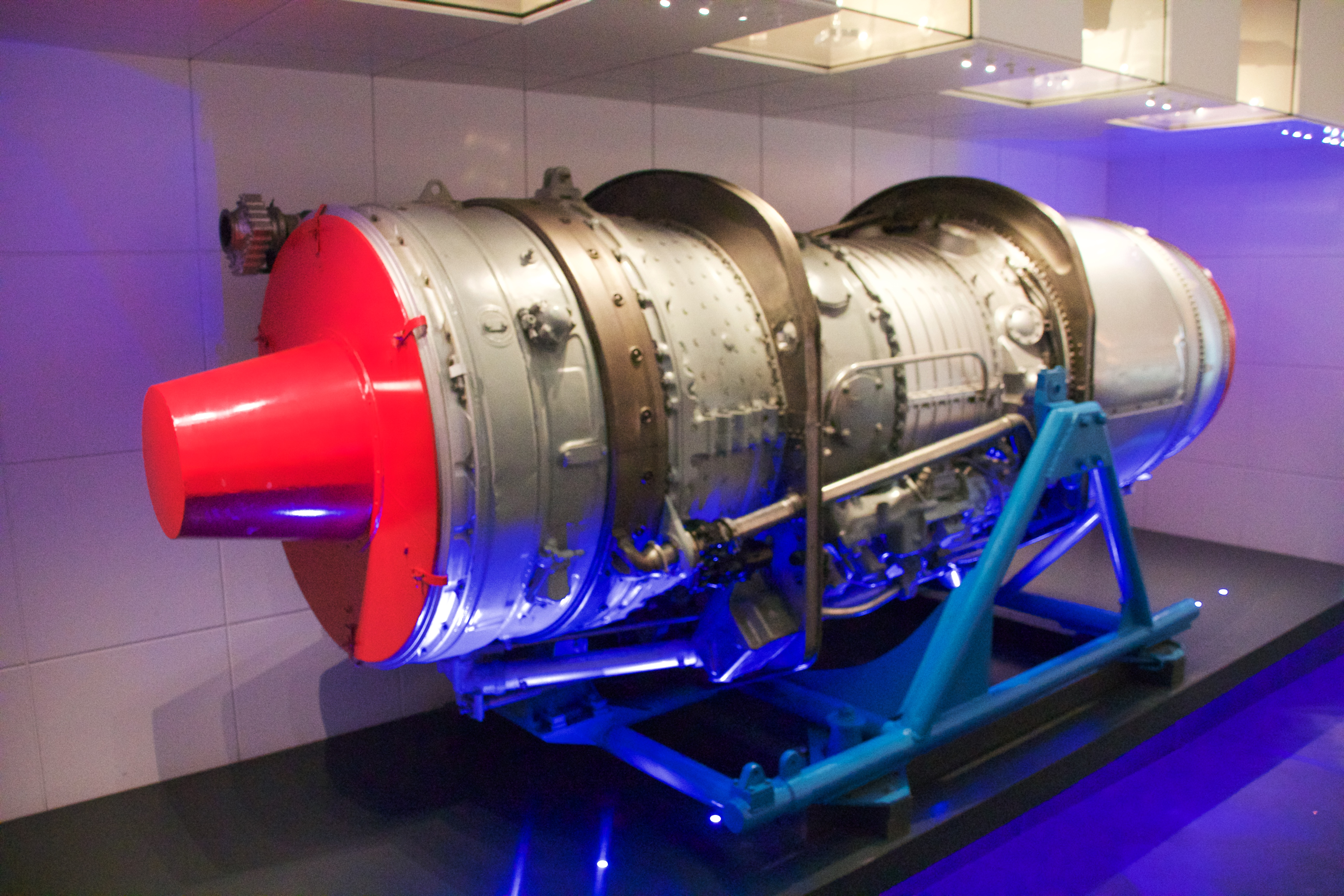
Rolls Royce Olympus 101 jet engine

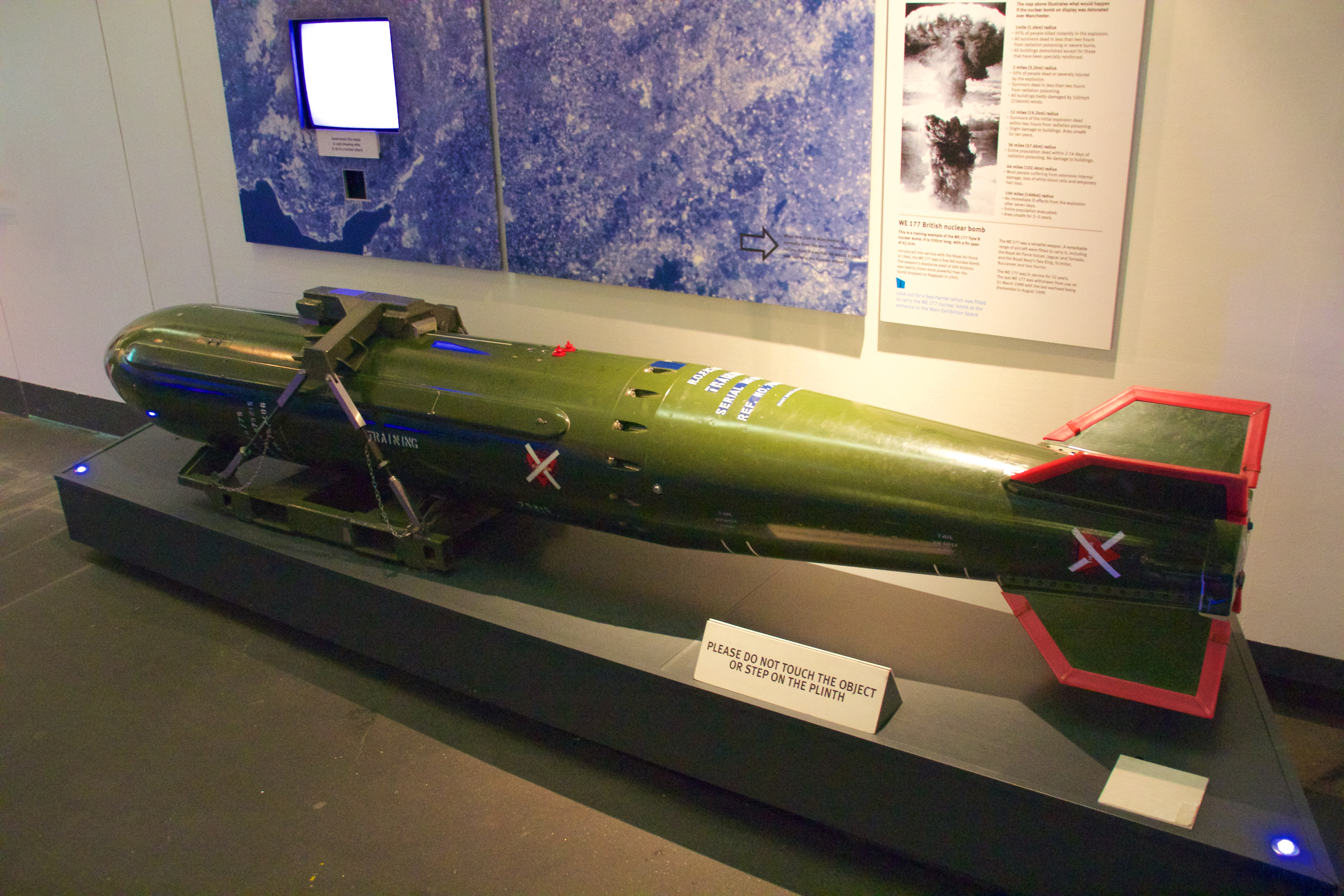
WE 177 British nuclear bomb

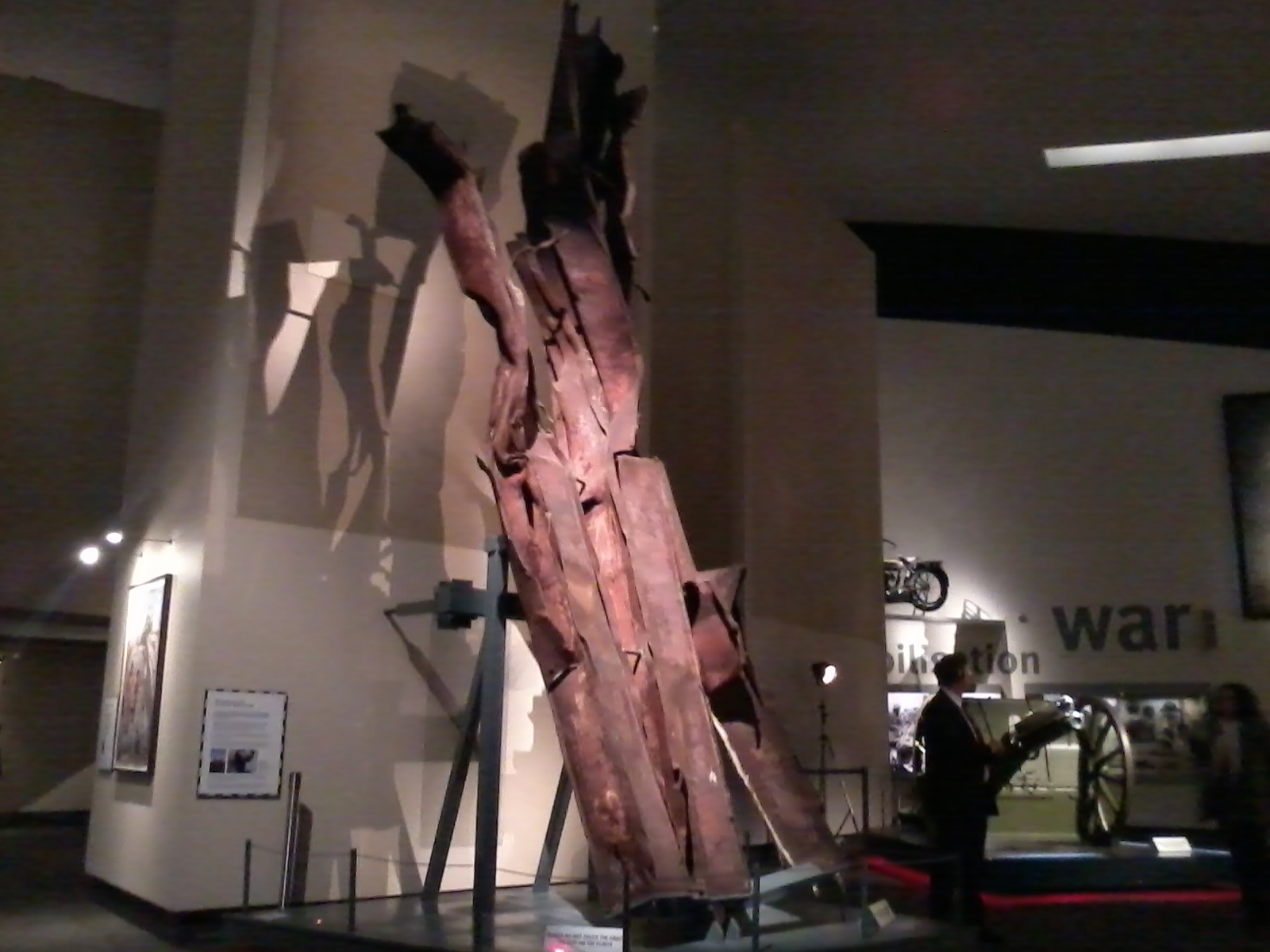
Wreckage from the September 11 attacks on New York's World Trade Center

The museum also displays artworks by official war artists who were commissioned to create a visual record of Britain during the world wars, among them Building Flying-Boats by Flora Lion; The 'L' Press. Forging the Jacket of an 18-inch Gun by Anna Airy; and Going to Work by L. S. Lowry (1943).

War artists displayed at IWM north

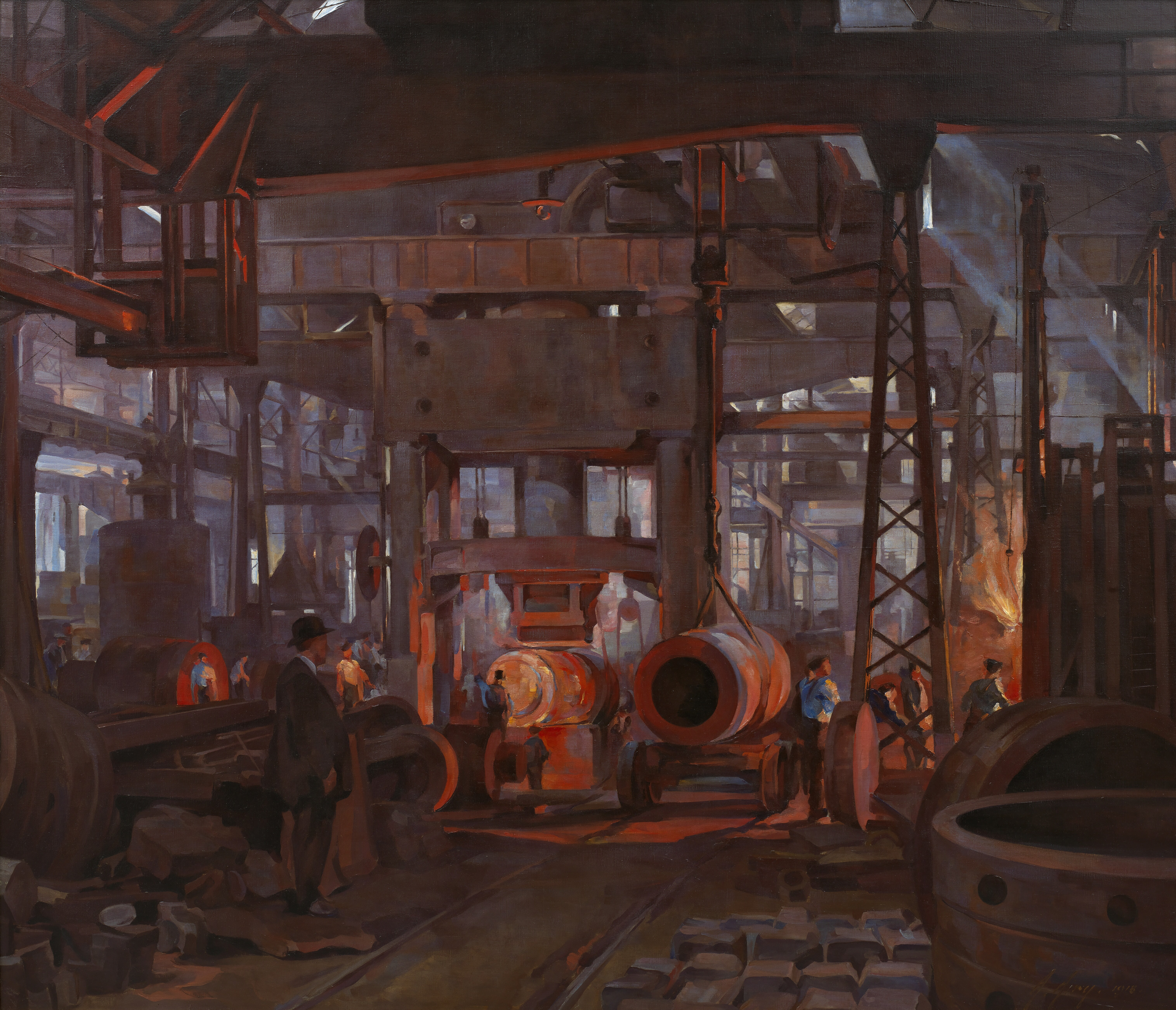
The 'L' Press. Forging the Jacket of an 18-inch Gun by Anna Airy (1918)

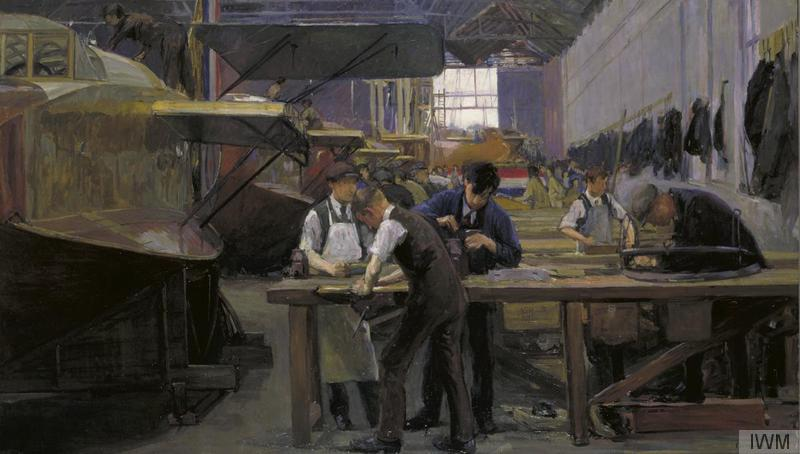
Building Flying-Boats by Flora Lion (1919)

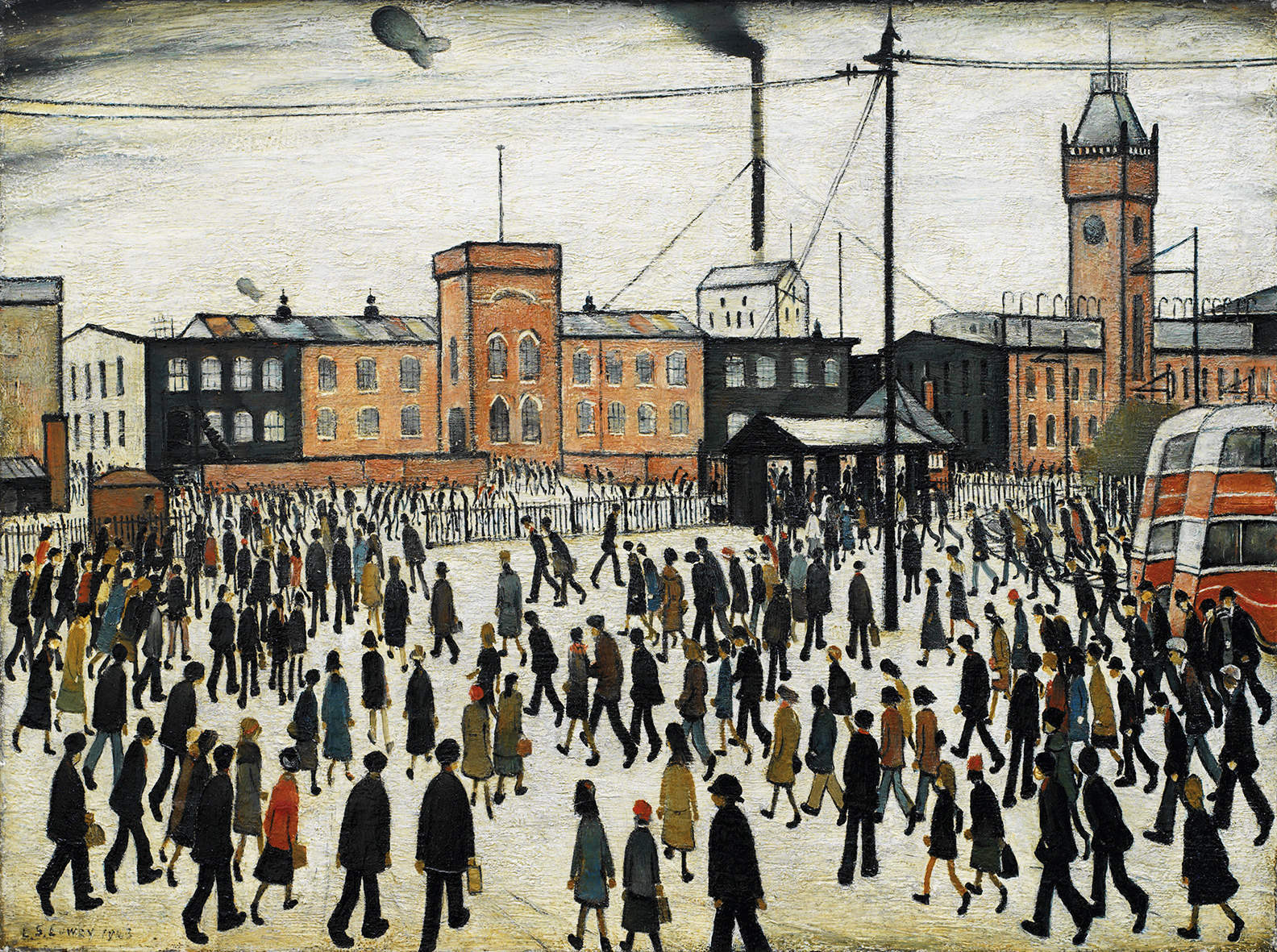
Going to Work by L. S. Lowry (1943)

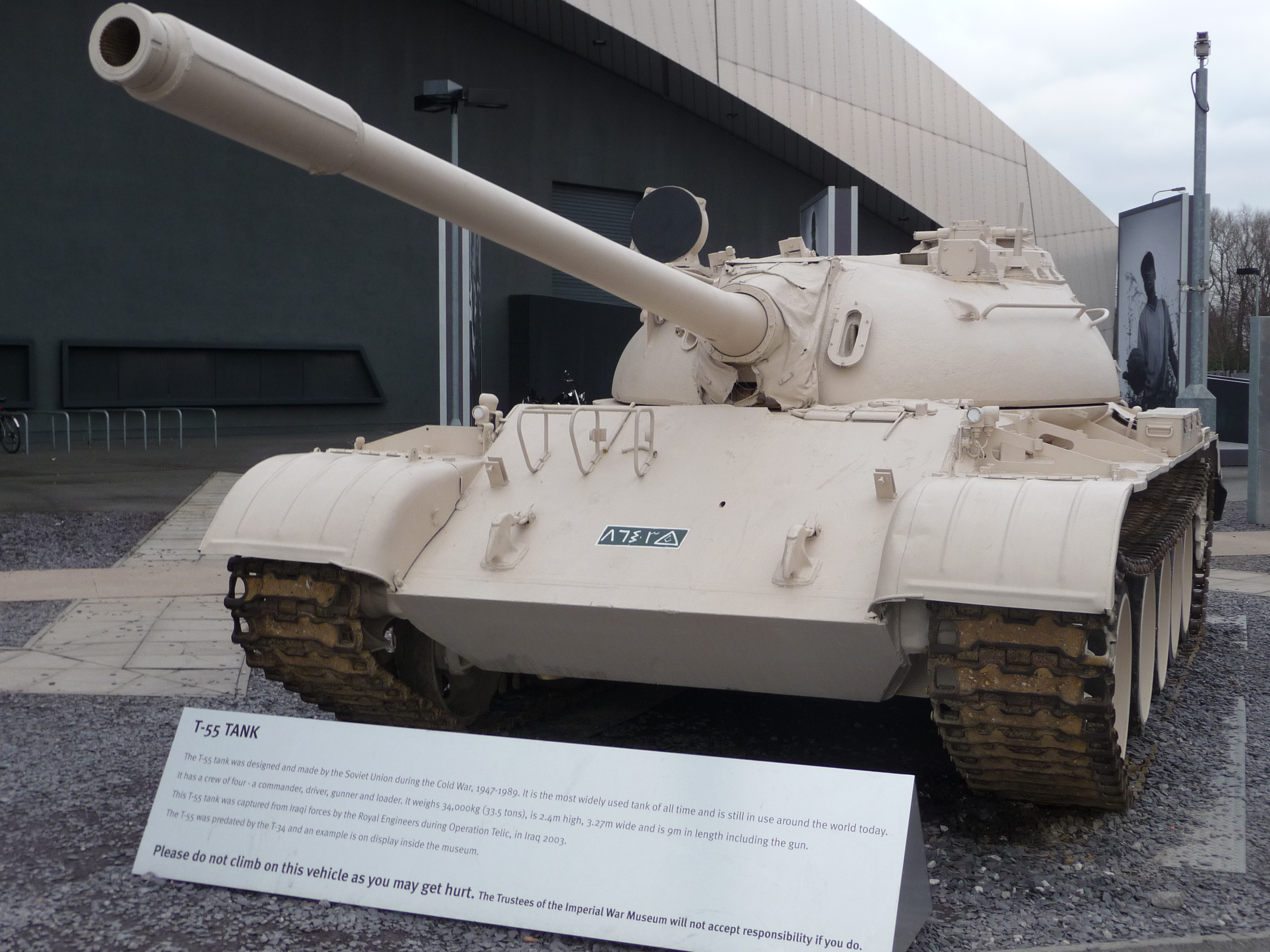
Ex-Iraqi Army T-55 tank on display outside the museum.

In addition to the physical exhibits, the walls of the gallery space are used as screens for the projection of hourly audiovisual presentations called the Big Picture, which explore themes related to modern conflict. These presentations use up to 1,500 images from the Imperial War Museum's photograph archive and were originally projected from 60 synchronised slide projectors mounted throughout the space. In 2011 digital projectors were installed, allowing a greater degree of flexibility. The images are complemented by personal accounts from the museum's oral history sound archive. The Big Picture was devised after the reduction in the museum's budget forced the scrapping of the previous exhibition plan by designers DEGW and Amalgam. With some seeing one of the museum's shortcomings as a lack of artefacts, the projections and the building itself are now the main attractions.

Also within the earth shard, a separate gallery accommodates a programme of temporary exhibitions. These have included the Witness series of art exhibitions from the museum's collection, examining First and Second World War art, and the work of female war artists.

The WaterWay, a passageway linking the earth and water shards, is used for smaller art or photographic exhibitions, such as Ghislaine Howard's photojournalism-inspired painting series 365.

Outside the museum building, an ex-Iraqi Ground Forces T-55 tank was put on display at the main entrance in August 2008. This vehicle was captured by the Royal Engineers during the opening stages of the Iraq War in 2003. The spot had previously been occupied by an Iraqi ZSU-23-4 Shilka anti-aircraft gun. Captured by the Royal Artillery after the 1991 Gulf War, it was moved from Imperial War Museum Duxford and displayed to mark the museum's fifth anniversary in July 2007.

== Reception ==
The museum enjoyed a successful first year, with an initial target of 300,000 visitors surpassed after six months, with over 100,000 visitors in the first six weeks; by the museum's first anniversary on 5 July 2003 some 470,000 visitors had been received. The museum won the Building Award in the 2003 British Construction Industry Awards, and was shortlisted for the 2004 Stirling Prize. The museum received a largely positive critical reception, with reviewers remarking on the metaphorical power of the building, the complementary effects of the museum's main exhibition with its internal architecture, and the economy with which the museum was built. In August 2005 Imperial War Museum North received its millionth visitor. The museum was, however, criticised in 2008 by The Guardian for poor energy efficiency, as part of a report into the carbon dioxide emissions of UK public buildings.

== Volunteer programme ==
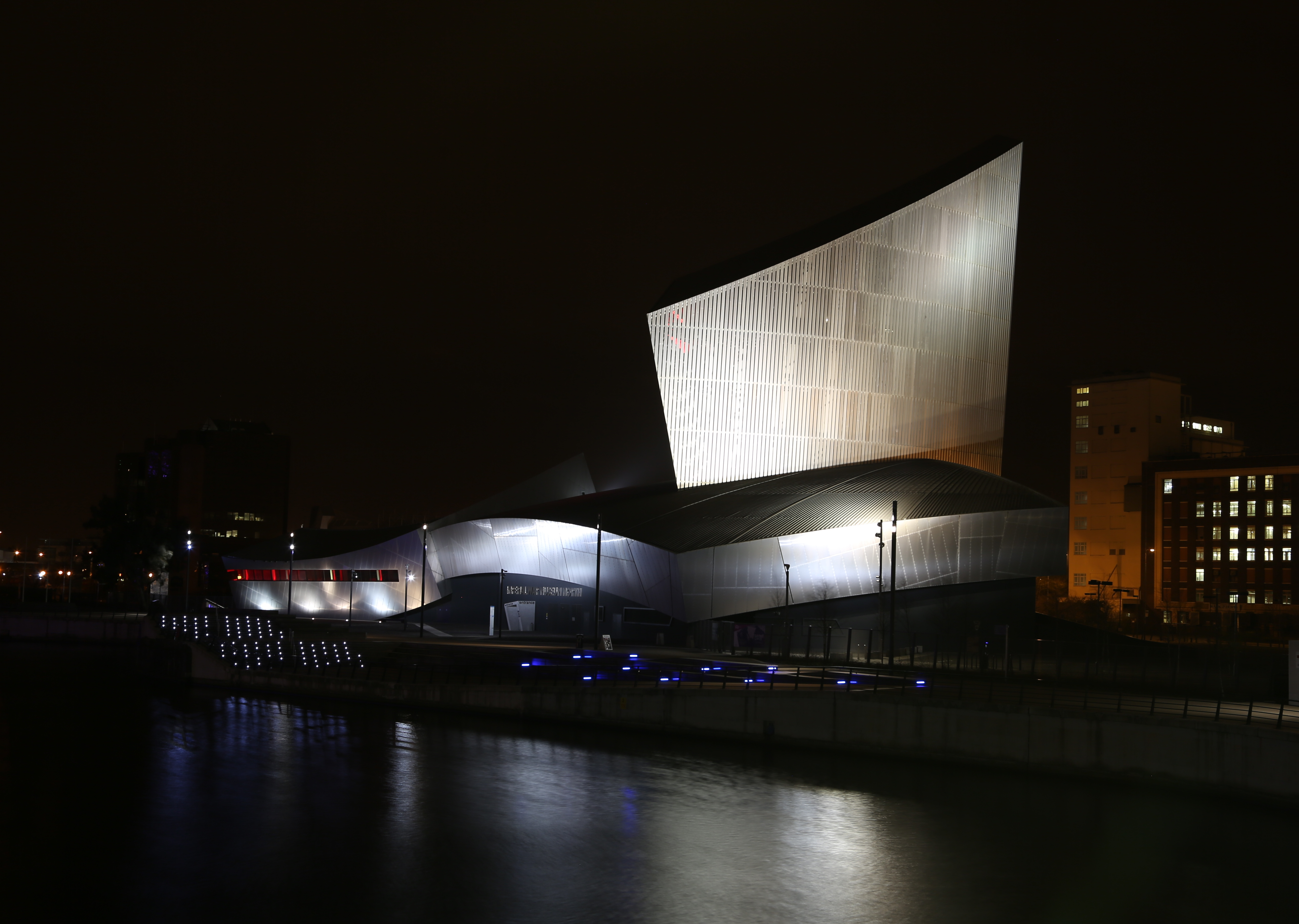
The museum at night

Supporting Imperial War Museum North's educational goals, the museum has operated a volunteer programme since opening in 2002. The programme seeks to engage local people at risk of social exclusion. Originally based on a National Vocational Qualification, the programme was revised and relaunched in 2004, and consisted of a basic cultural heritage course, providing opportunities to develop academic skills and improve confidence, and to support individuals seeking to return to employment. In return volunteers work in the museum's public spaces as part of the front of house teams. In January 2007 the museum launched the in Touch volunteer programme, in partnership with Manchester Museum and supported by £425,000 from the National Lottery Heritage Fund. The programme was recognised by the Department of Culture, Media and Sport as a case study of its kind, in the department's Third Sector Strategy.
