= Mather & Platt =

Engineering companies

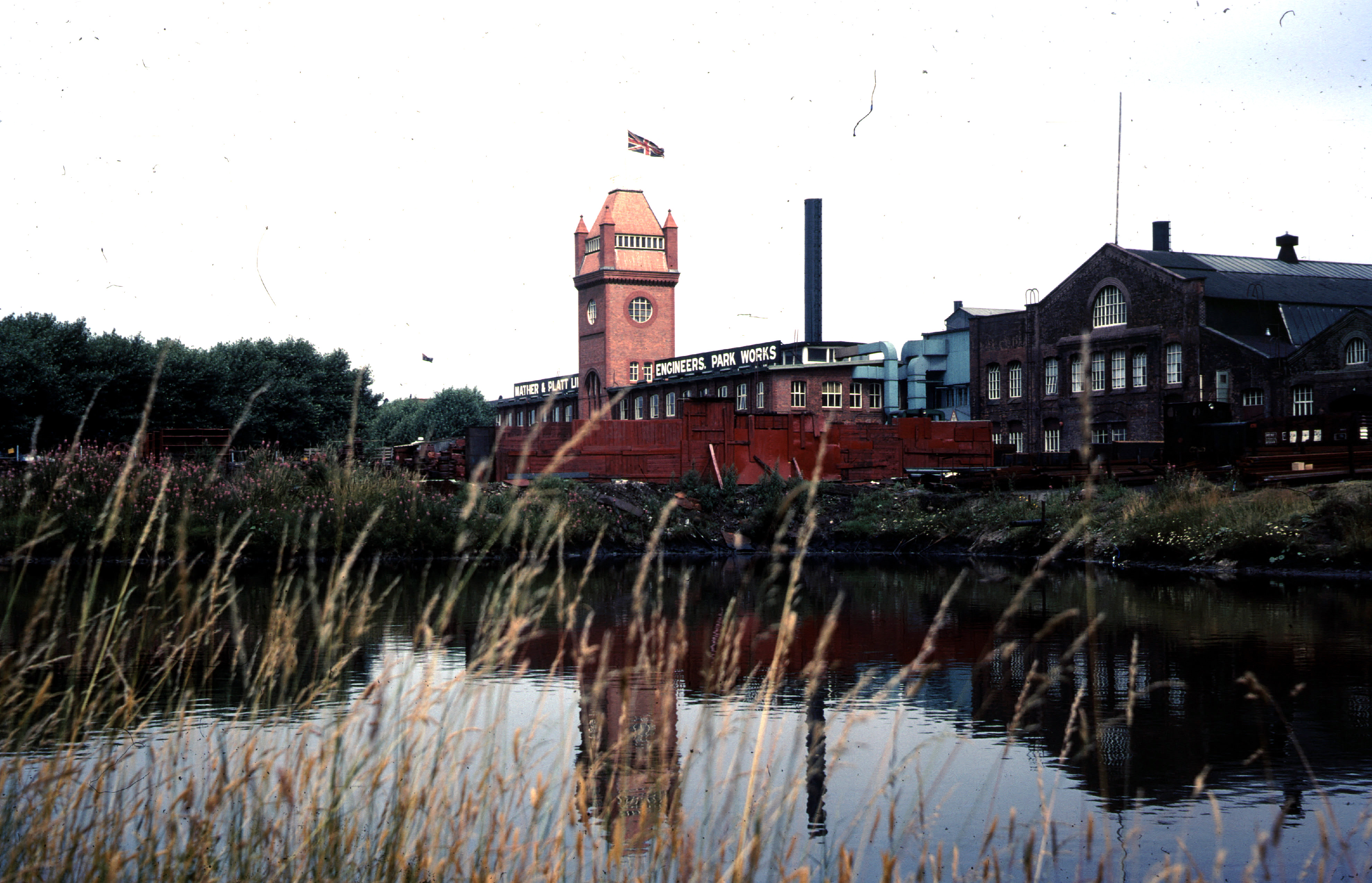
- Park Works, Newton Heath
- Company type: Textile machinery, electrical centrifugal pumps
- Industry: Manufacture of machinery for textile, apparel and leather production machinery industry and plant construction manufacture of other pumps and compressors
- Founded: 1845
- Headquarters: Johannesburg and Chinchwad
- Area served: South Africa and India
- Products: electrical centrifugal pumps
- Parent: Wilo SE, Germany

Mather & Platt is the name of several large engineering firms in Europe, South Africa and Asia that are subsidiaries of Wilo SE, Germany. They were founded by former employees. The original company was founded in the Newton Heath area of Manchester, England, where it was a major employer. That firm continues as a food processing and packaging business, trading as M & P Engineering in Trafford Park, Manchester.

The core business produces large electrical centrifugal pumps. The brand is known in India as Mather & Platt Pumps and in South Africa as Mather & Platt SA PTY Ltd.

== History ==
=== Timeline ===
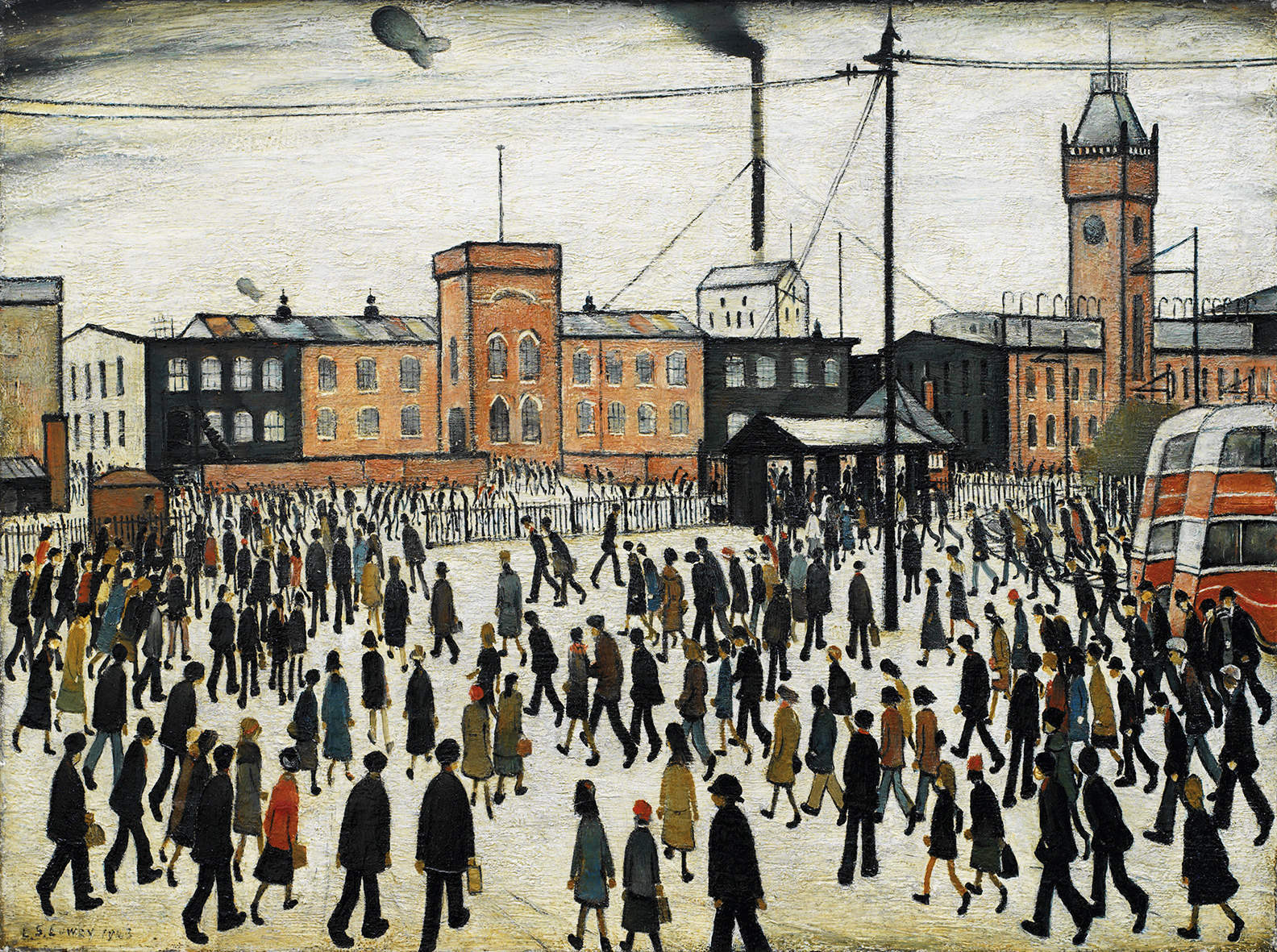
Going to Work by L S Lowry, 1943

- 1794: A map is published, showing the Salford Iron Works, Chapel Street, Salford, owned by Bateman and Sherratt.
- 1817: Peter Mather starts making textile machinery.
- 1829: By now only the Sherratts are active at the Salford Iron Works. John and Thomas Sherratt describe themselves as "brass founders, engine makers and iron founders".
- 1836: The Sherratts called themselves "iron founders, steam engine manufacturers, millwrights and hydraulic press manufacturers".
- 1836: Colin "Cast iron Colin" Mather and his brother started a small business, William & Colin Mather. It serviced the local textile bleaching industry by providing simple well-made rollers and equipment. They described themselves as "Engineers, machine makers and millwrights". They had a premises at 23 Brown Street, Salford.
  - Colin Mather had three sons, none of whom were destined to play a large role in the business.
  - William Mather, who had had little to do with the running of the business, had two sons, and his second son William Mather became the chairman when Colin retired. William Mather and John Platt travelled extensively in the US and Russia expanding into new markets. Mather was also involved in public life and the advancement of education. He was the Liberal Member of Parliament for Salford in 1885 and later for Gorton.
- 1837: Thomas Sherratt dies.
- 1837: Platt takes over the Salford Iron Works
- 1839: The Salford Iron Works was leased to John Platt a machine-maker from Higher Broughton. Platt and his partner Yates continued Sherratt's business.
- 1845: John Platt leased part of the Salford Iron Works to William and Colin Mather. Mather and John Platt form Mather & Platt in Newton Heath in Manchester (UK)
- 1847: John Platt dies.
- 1851: Mather and Platt exhibit at the Great Exhibition as the Salford Iron Works; they took textile finishing equipment including an eight-colour roller printer for calico.
- 1853: John Platt's son William Platt forms the partnership with the Mathers, forming Mather & Platt. William Platt provide capital, land and casting skills; Colin Mather provided the new engineering solution.
- 1873: Professor Osborne Reynolds designed a turbine pump that Mather and Platt improved. The centrifugal pump was essential to operating a bleaching kier, hence their interest. Later, it became the core product and it is the Pump division alone that survives in India.
- 1883: Mather & Platt obtain the rights to manufacture Edison’s electric dynamo and, as a result of improvements by Dr. John Hopkinson, the Edison-Hopkinson dynamo was produced. This led to the formation of an electrical engineering division doing military work on submarine motors as well as later involvement in electricity generation.

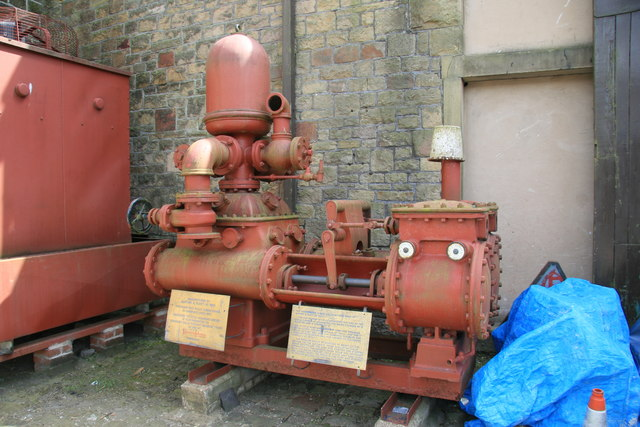
M&P fire pump 1890

- 1883: Mather & Platt obtain sole rights outside the USA to manufacture the Grinnel's automatic sprinkler: cotton mills were very vulnerable to fire. These rights expired in the 1970s. The production of sprinkler systems for cotton mills led to the prominent water towers and flat roofs for water storage.
- 1899: Mather & Platt incorporated.

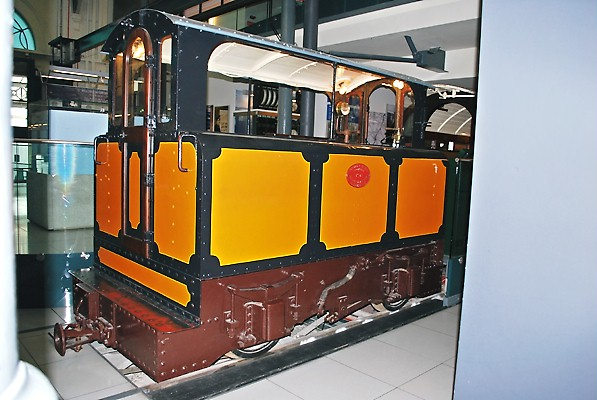
M&P underground loco 1890

- The firm was expanding and over the years acquired neighbouring properties such as Drinkwaters Mill and whole streets such as Foundry Street.
- 1894: An agreement was reached to close Union Street and demolish two rows of cottages for the new "erecting shop" which had the splendid name of the Klondyke. Further expansion was impossible. The need for space was partially caused by the acquisition of three important new products described here.

=== 20th century ===
==== Park Works, Newton Heath ====
- 1900: Mather & Platt erect on the present Park Works site an administration building, two storeys high. That is the start of moving to and developing the Park Works, Newton Heath, SJ873998 53°29′42″N 2°11′35″W site, joining with Dowson, Taylor & Company Limited, to form Mathers Platt Ltd. The site measured 50 acres (200,000 m^{2}) and was alongside, and with direct access to, the Lancashire and Yorkshire Railway.
  - The first machine shop was originally the Machinery Annexe of the Paris Exhibition of 1900. Mather & Platt's staff dismantled it and shipped it to Manchester via the Manchester Ship Canal, then re-erected it.
  - The site expanded over the years, eventually incorporating a research laboratory, an iron foundry and a sports ground.
- 31 December 1938: The Salford Foundry closed when the heavy iron foundry was built at the Park Works. Mather and Platt left the Salford Iron Works, and it passed into the hands of Threlfalls the brewery. Later a part of the works passed to a firm of motor car spring manufacturers.

==== Expansion elsewhere ====
- 1940: Mather & Platt's start manufacturing in India with a factory at Kolkata
- 1959: Mather & Platt's set up a second manufacturing unit set up at Chinchwad, Pune
- 1978: Mather & Platt's changes its share holding pattern to become an Indian company
- 1978: Mather & Platt's was taken over by the Australian-based company Wormald International. The Pump Department was later sold to the Scottish company Weir Pumps, now Clyde Union Pumps, who supply the OEM spare parts. They used the Newton Heath site until Oct 2008. Most of the original buildings have now been demolished but the foundry and main office building have survived
- 1982: Fraberry Engineering buys Mather & Platt's Process machinery division to form M&P (Engineering) Ltd. based in Trafford Park. The founder, Frank Berry, goes on to form Mather and Platt (Asia) Limited, based in Bangkok, Thailand.

=== 21st century ===
- 2005: Mather & Platt's becomes part of Wilo SE, Germany
- 7 October 2008: The Westley Group (a £40m-turnover business with headquarters in Cradley Heath, West Midlands and employing 500 people on its four sites) buy the old stainless steel foundry at Park Works, Newton Heath from the Weir Group.
  - Westley group directors Rob and James Salisbury have a family connection with the foundry and renamed the site "Mather's Foundry". Their grandfather Jim Musgrave served an apprenticeship at Mather & Platt's from 1932, when he was 14. Mathers specialise in the supply of commercial and high-integrity castings in carbon steels, low alloys steels, CrMo steels, nickel alloys, stainless steels, duplex steels, super nickel and the ZERON range. They supply bespoke cast products from a few kilos to 10 tonnes in weight to companies supplying the oil and gas, desalination, nuclear (N stamp), paper, rubber, chemical, and power generation industries.
- 2011: the Indian engineering company WPIL acquires the Park Works foundry.
- 2017: The Park Works site closes after 117 years in operation, and has since been demolished.

=== Newton Heath site ===
==== Avro ====
- 1910: A. V. Roe & Company (Avro) is founded in Manchester by Humphrey and Alliott Verdon Roe.
- 1914: Outbreak of World War I: Avro rented part of the Newton Heath site so they could expand production.
- 1919: A new purpose-built factory for Avro was completed.
  - The Avro Avian designed by Roy Chadwick was built there, and later, parts for the Avro Lancaster bomber. When Avro left the site after World War II the factory was used as a storage depot by the Co-operative Wholesale Society (CWS). Today the building is used by various businesses for storage.

=== Boiler Yard ===
The Plate Metal Works, also called the Boiler Yard, was owned by yet another John Platt, who was not related to the main Platt family. He occasionally subcontracted for Mather & Platt.

- 1870: John Platt passed the Boiler Yard over to Mather & Platt and was employed as a foreman over 25 men.
- 1906: The Boiler Yard was extended, absorbing the adjoining works of Edmondson and. Co., General Engineers and using it as a machine shop and plate shop. It continued as a Mather and Platt Ltd. production site after the Salford Iron Works was closed - maintaining a link between Mather & Platt and Salford till after 1950.

== India ==
- Mather and Platt Pumps Ltd. operate from India.

== Art and media ==
The main entrance to the Park Works features in the 1943 painting Going to Work by LS Lowry. The picture is now in the collection of the Imperial War Museum.

The Park Works foundry was used in 2013 as a filming location for the television drama Peaky Blinders.

== See also ==
- Platt Brothers
