= The Pastel Society =

London-based art society

The Pastel Society is an art society, based in London, which promotes the use of pastel painting in contemporary art, through exhibitions, workshops, demonstrations and lectures.

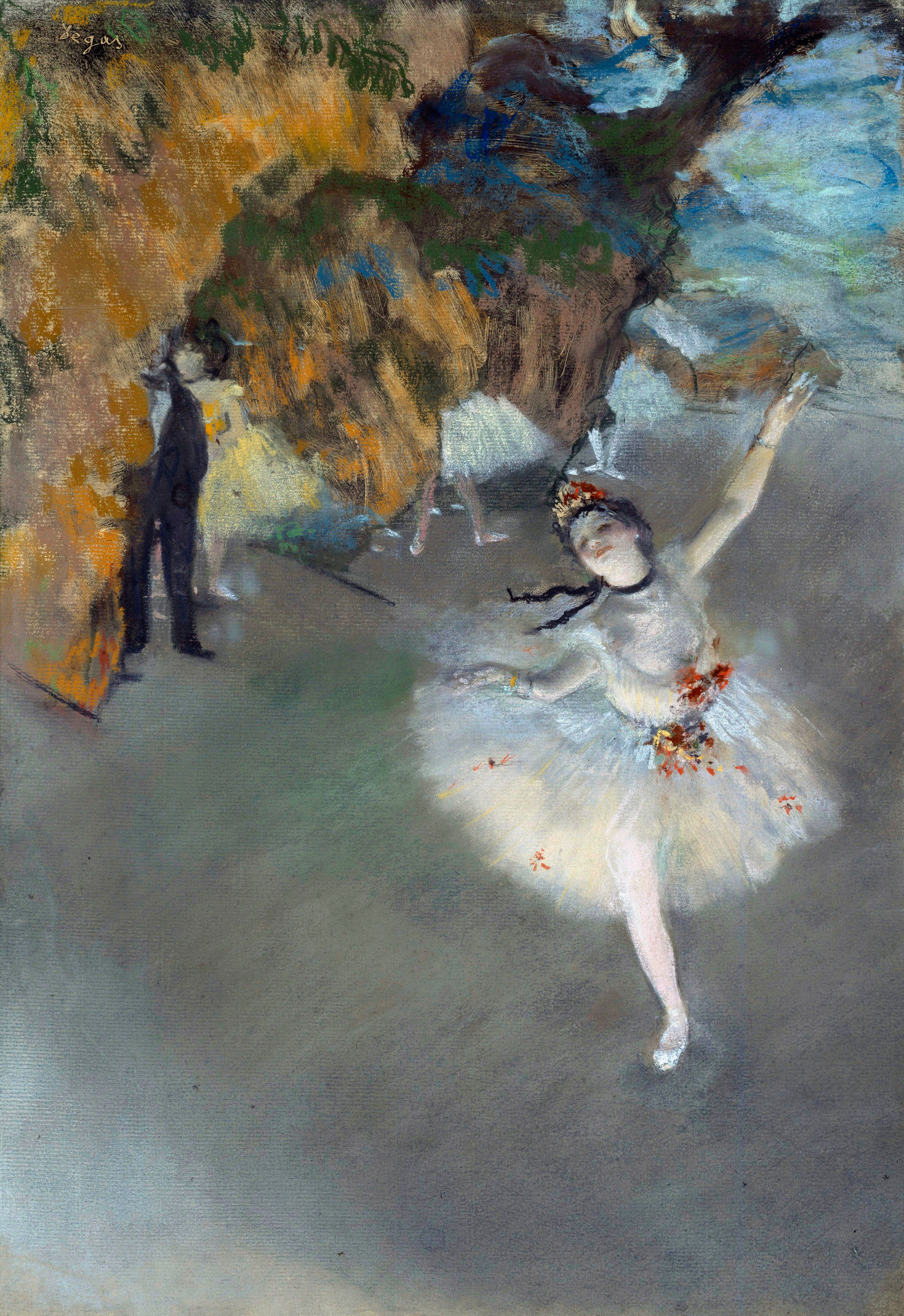
Edgar Degas

The Pastel Society is a registered charity and was founded in England in 1898. Its first exhibition was held in the Royal Institute, Piccadilly, London. It holds an annual exhibition in the Mall Galleries. In 2015, there were more than 55 members, who are professional artists.

It is one of the nine member societies that form the Federation of British Artists.

== History ==
Prior to the founding of the Pastel Society in London similar societies had been founded in New York City and Paris, as well as a predecessor in London. In 1882 The Society of Painters in Pastel was founded in New York by William Merritt Chase, Robert Frederick Blum, James Carroll Beckwith, Hugh Bolton Jones and Edwin Blashfield. Influenced by The Society of Painters in Pastel, in 1885 the Société des Pastellistes was founded by artists in Paris. The London Pastel Society held their first exhibition in 1888. The Society was organised by Sir John Coutts Lindsay, owner of the Grosvenor Gallery. Prominent members of The London Pastel Society were William Rothenstein and Philip Wilson Steer.

However, all three predecessors were short-lived. The Society of Painters in Pastel held its fourth and final exhibition in 1890. The Société des Pastellistes disappeared after holding ten or more annual exhibitions. The London Pastel Society did not survive beyond 1890, when its president Sir John Coutts Lindsay had to close the Grosvenor Gallery for financial reasons.

Early members and early exhibitors include Anna Airy, Mary Alexandra Bell, Eleanor Fortescue-Brickdale, Brangwyn, Degas, Rodin, Rothenstein, Whistler, and G. F. Watts.

For further details on the Society's history, see Anthony J. Lester's essay in The Pastel Society: Pastel Painting & Drawing 1898-2000 (ISBN 0 9537927 0 6), published in 2000.

== Notable members ==
In addition to the early members and exhibitors noted above, other notable Members of The Pastel Society have included:

- Edwin Austin Abbey
- Cicely Mary Barker
- Minnie Agnes Cohen
- Isobelle Ann Dods-Withers

== See also ==
- Federation of British Artists
