= Isobelle Ann Dods-Withers =

Scottish artist (1876–1939)

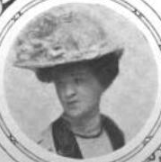
- Born: Isobelle Ann Dods; 5 February 1876; North Berwick, Scotland
- Died: 13 June 1939 (aged 63); Kensington, England
- Education: Edinburgh College of Art
- Known for: Painting
- Spouse: Alfred Withers

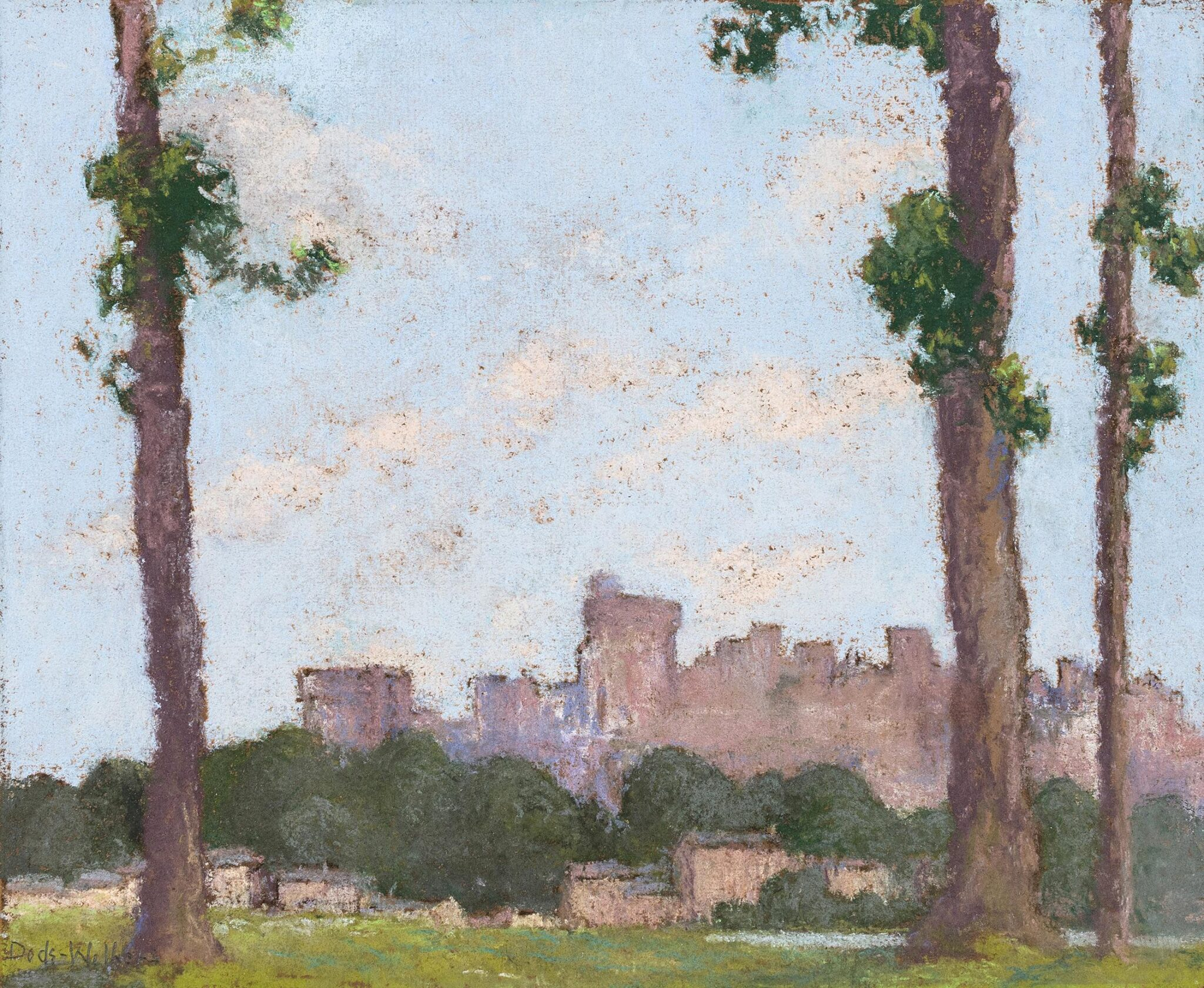
Windsor Castle, Morning (pastels, circa 1920)

Isobelle Ann Dods-Withers (née Dods; 5 February 1876 – 13 June 1939) was a Scottish oil and pastel artist who was known for her paintings of towns and villages in southern Europe.

== Biography ==
Dods-Withers was born at Congalton Mains at North Berwick in Scotland. Her father was a John William Dods and when she married Alfred Withers she took Dods-Withers as her surname. After studying at the Edinburgh College of Art Dods-Withers had a prolific exhibition career both in Britain and overseas. In Britain she was a frequent exhibitor at the Royal Academy, with the Royal Institute of Oil Painters, the International Society of Sculptors, Painters and Gravers, The Pastel Society and the Women's International Art Club. Overseas, Dods-Withers work was shown at the Paris Salon, in Munich, Barcelonia and San Francisco.

She died at Campden Hill on 13 June 1939, and was cremated at Woking.
