= Wilo =

German manufacturer of pumps and pump systems

WILO SE
- Industry: Manufacturing
- Founded: 1872
- Founder: Caspar Ludwig Opländer
- Headquarters: Dortmund, Germany
- Area served: Worldwide
- Key people: Oliver Hermes (Chairman & CEO) Dr. Patrick Niehr (CFO) Georg Weber (CTO)
- Products: Sustainable and intelligent premium water solutions
- Revenue: EUR 1.918,7 million (2025)
- Number of employees: 8.910 (2025)
- Website: www.wilo.com

WILO SE is a German manufacturer of pumps and pump systems for the building technology, water and industrial sectors with headquarters in Dortmund, Germany. Founded in 1872 as copper and brass factory by Louis Opländer, the company has over 90 production facilities in more than 50 countries and employs around 9000 people worldwide (2025 annual average).

Wilo SE is the managerial holding of the WILO group, a result of a merger between Wilo-Salmson AG and Wilo GmbH in 2002. For the year 2021, the company registered a revenue of EUR 1,885.7 million with an EBIT of EUR 196.7 million. EUR 70.6 million was spent by the group for research and development in 2022. The group manufactures pumps and pump systems at 15 production facilities across Europe, Asia and America. The group produce about 10 million pumps annually.

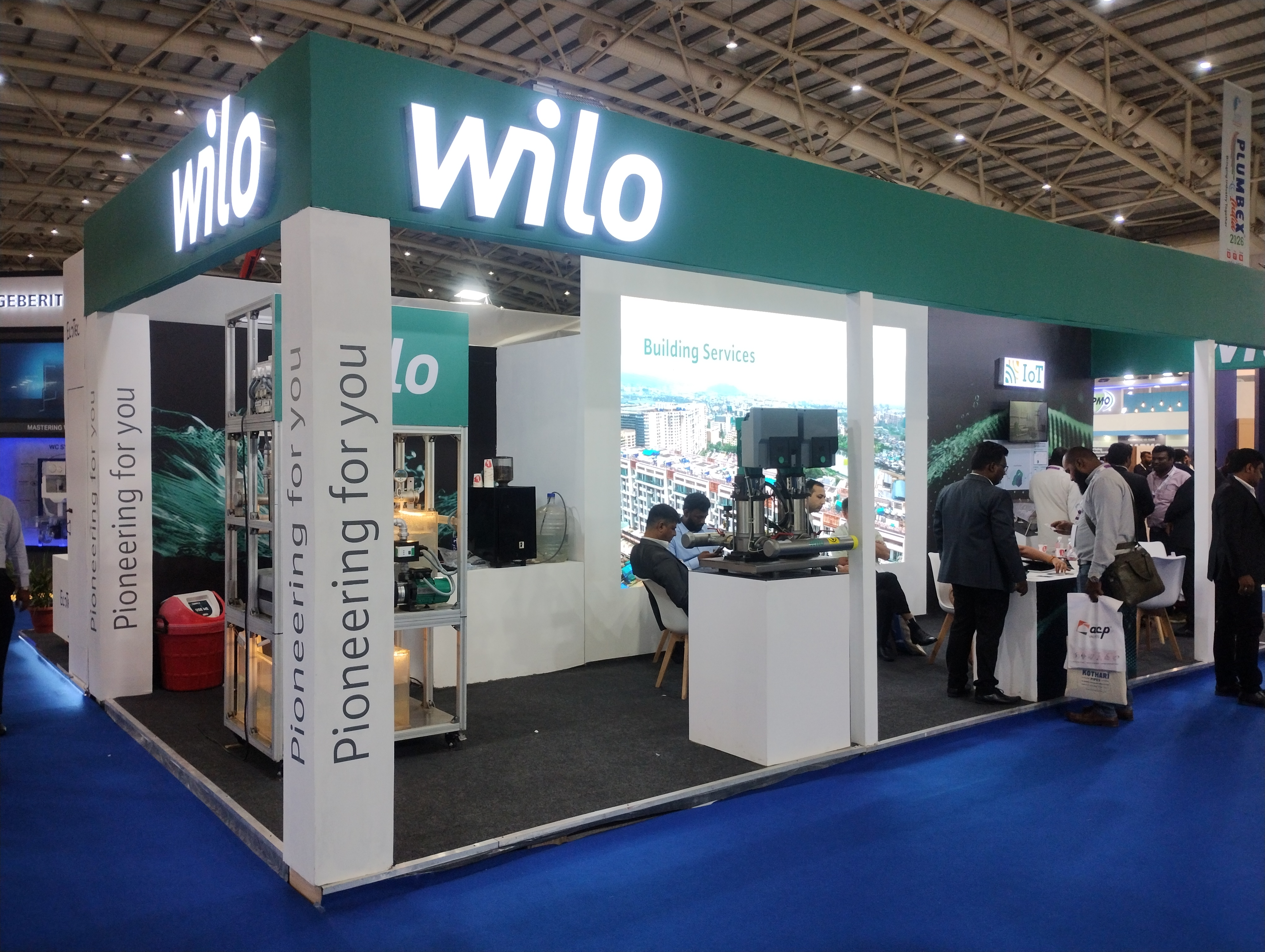
Wilo at Plumbex India 2026, BIEC

== History ==
Caspar Ludwig ("Louis") Opländer founded the company in 1872 as a copper and brassware factory in Dortmund. The Caspar Ludwig Opländer Foundation, founded by the Opländer family in 2011, is the majority shareholder of the WILO SE with a stake of approximately 90 percent.

WILO group is managed by an executive board and a supervisory board composed of internationally recognised business leaders. The Wilo Executive Board members include Oliver Hermes (Chairman & CEO), Georg Weber (CTO) and Mathias Weyers (CFO).

== Brands ==
=== Wilo ===
Wilo is a manufacturer of pumps, submersible mixers and related intelligent control systems. The product portfolio includes complete range of centrifugal pumps starting from small circulator, inline, multistage, submersible, end-suction, split case, vertical turbine to packaged Pumping stations. Product development and manufacturing of Wilo products is based mainly in Germany and France.

=== Mather and Platt ===
Mather and Platt which started operations in India in 1913 is a specialist manufacturer of large capacity engineered centrifugal pumps such as Multi-stage, Vertical Turbine, Non-clog and Axial Split Case for water and sewage applications. Mather and Platt Pumps Ltd. became a part of Wilo SE in the year 2005. The subsidiary which was renamed as Wilo Mather and Platt Pvt. Ltd, will be known as Wilo India from 2020.

=== American-Marsh ===
American-Marsh Pumps is a manufacturer of centrifugal & positive displacement pumps, electrical motors, mechanical seals and fire protection fittings, couplings and pumping equipment. Headquartered in Collierville, Tennessee, American-Marsh is over 140 years old and is one of the oldest pump manufacturers in the world. WILO SE acquired American-Marsh Pumps LLC. in 2019. The production will be relocated to the new Wilo USA headquarters bringing the operations of Wilo USA, Weil Pump, Scot Pump and American-Marsh Pumps to a single production site.

=== Weil ===
Weil Pump, located in Cedarburg, WI, specializes in the manufacture of waste water pumps and end-suction centrifugal pumps with a series of full cast stainless steel submersible pumps for chemical applications. Weil Pumps was acquired by Wilo SE in 2017.

=== Scot ===
Based out of Cedarburg USA, Scot is a 50 year old manufacturer of centrifugal pumps with focus on the End Suction Single Stage pumps ranging from 3/4” through 12” with 1/3 through 125 HP motors. Scot concentrates on the OEM end-suction pump market for the plastics, agricultural and chemical industries. Scot also has a branch office in Fort Lauderdale, Florida, which manufactures special-purpose marine pumps for the shipbuilding industry. Scot Pumps was acquired by Wilo USA in 2017.

== Timeline ==
- 1872 Foundation of the company "Messingwarenfabrik Louis Opländer Maschinenbau"
- 1928 Invention of the world's first circulation accelerator
- 1965 Wilo international: Foundation of own subsidiaries
- 1984 Acquisition of the French pump manufacturer Pompes Salmson
- 1988 Launch of Wilo "Star-E", the world's first electronically regulated circulation pump
- 1994 New production plant, Wilo Pumps Ltd., opened in Korea
- 2001 In-house electronic production, Dortmund
- 2003 Acquisition of the EMU Unterwasserpumpen GmbH and EMU Anlagenbau GmbH
- 2005 Acquisition of Mather & Platt Pumps Ltd., India
- 2006 Acquisition of Circulating Pumps Ltd., King's Lynn, Norfolk / England
- 2008 Change from WILO AG to WILO SE (Societas Europaea)
- 2011 Foundation of the Caspar Ludwig Opländer Foundation
- 2014 Formation of Wilo Salmson France SAS merging Wilo France and Pompes Salmson
- 2016 Acquisition of GVA Gesellschaft für Verfahren der Abwassertechnik mbH & Co.
- 2016 Opening of new production plant in Moscow, Russia
- 2017 Acquisition of Weil Pump, Scot Pump Karak Machine Corporation by Wilo USA.
- 2019 Opening of MENA region headquarters and production plant in Dubai, United Arab Emirates
- 2019 Acquisition of American-Marsh Pumps by Wilo USA
- 2021 Opening of Wilopark, new headquarters of Wilo SE in Dortmund, spread across 200,000 m^{2} area
- 2022 Opening of new 244,000 ft² headquarters and production facility for Wilo USA

== Main production sites ==
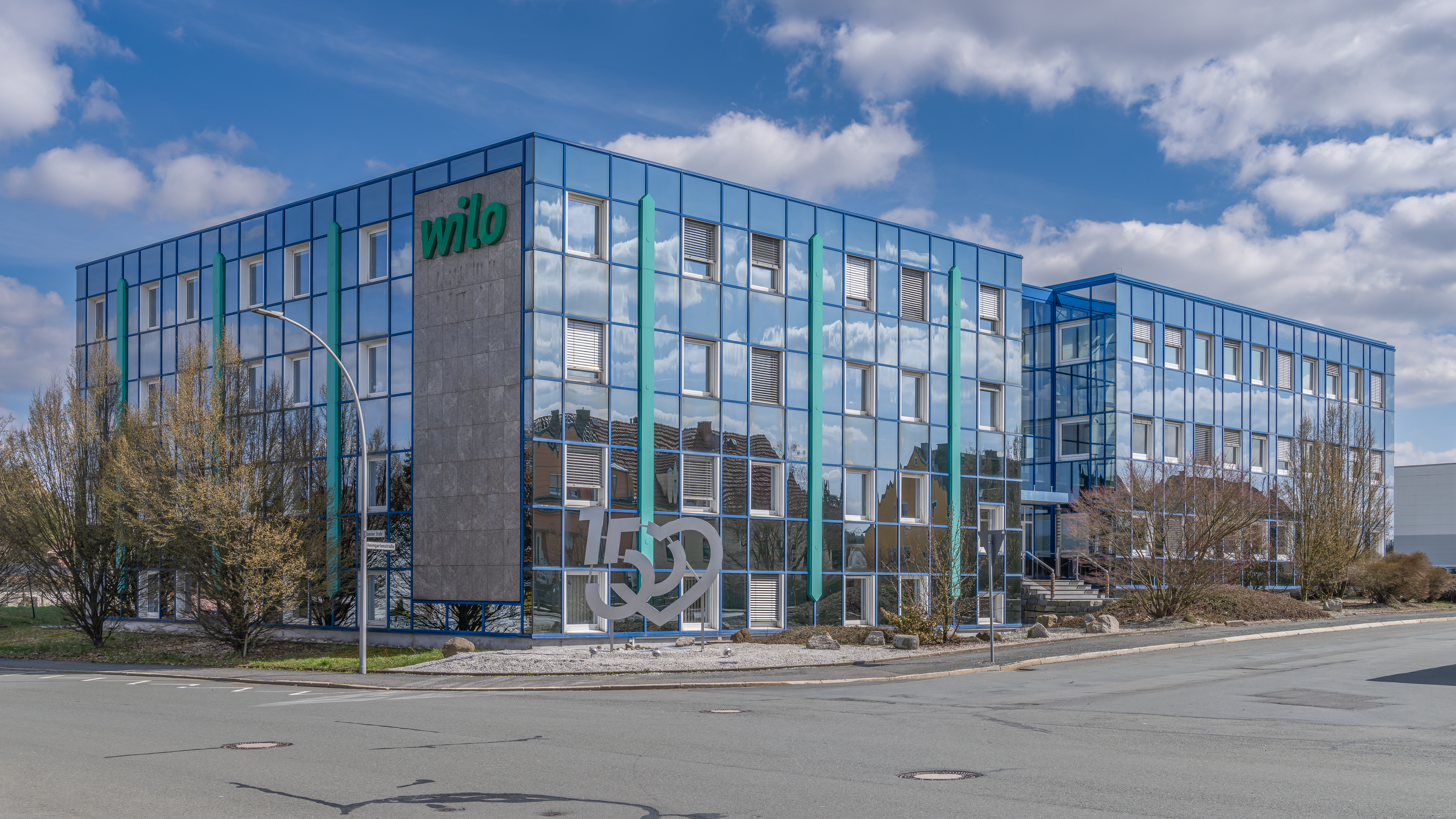
The site in Hof (Saale), Germany

- WILO SE, Dortmund/Germany
- WILO SE, Oschersleben/Germany
- WILO SE, Hof/Germany
- WILO EMU Anlagenbau GmbH, Roth/Germany
- WILO France SAS, Laval/France
- WILO Intec S.A.S., Aubigny/France
- WILO USA LLC, Cedarburg/Wisconsin/USA
- WILO USA LLC, Collierville/Tennessee/USA
- WILO RUS o.o.o., Moscow/Russia
- WILO China Ltd., Beijing/China
- WILO ELEC China Ltd., Qinhuangdao/China
- WILO Pumps Ltd., Busan/Korea
- WILO Mather and Platt Pumps Pvt. Ltd., Pune/India
- WILO Mather and Platt Pumps Pvt. Ltd., Kolhapur/India
- WILO Pompa Sistemleri A.Ş., Istanbul/Turkey
- WILO SYSTEMS ITALIA SRL, Bari/Italy
- WILO Middle East, Dubai/United Arab Emirates
