= Flora Lion =

English painter

- Born: Flora Marguerite Lion; 3 December 1878; London
- Died: 15 May 1958 (aged 79); London
- Education: St. John's Wood Art School; Royal Academy Schools; Academie Julian
- Known for: Painting

Flora Marguerite Lion (3 December 1878 – 15 May 1958) was an English portrait painter. Lion had a long and successful career and was known for her portraits of society figures, landscapes and murals.

== Early life ==
Flora Lion was born in London to Jewish Anglo-Franco parents. Her family was related to the Solomon family, a wealthy and cultured Jewish family that produced the artists Solomon Joseph Solomon and Lily Delissa Joseph. She studied art at the St. John's Wood Art School in 1894 before receiving further training at the Royal Academy Schools between 1895 and 1899, where her tutors included John Singer Sargent. Lion then attended the Académie Julian in Paris throughout 1899 and 1900. From 1900 onwards she exhibited at the Royal Academy. In 1915 she married the journalist and artist Ralph Amato, who adopted her surname. She was more of a successful artist then Amato, and he was described in one source at the time as the husband of Flora Lion. This was rare for this period as it was usual for women to be defined by their husband's profession. Amato also worked as her secretary and press officer.

== World War One ==
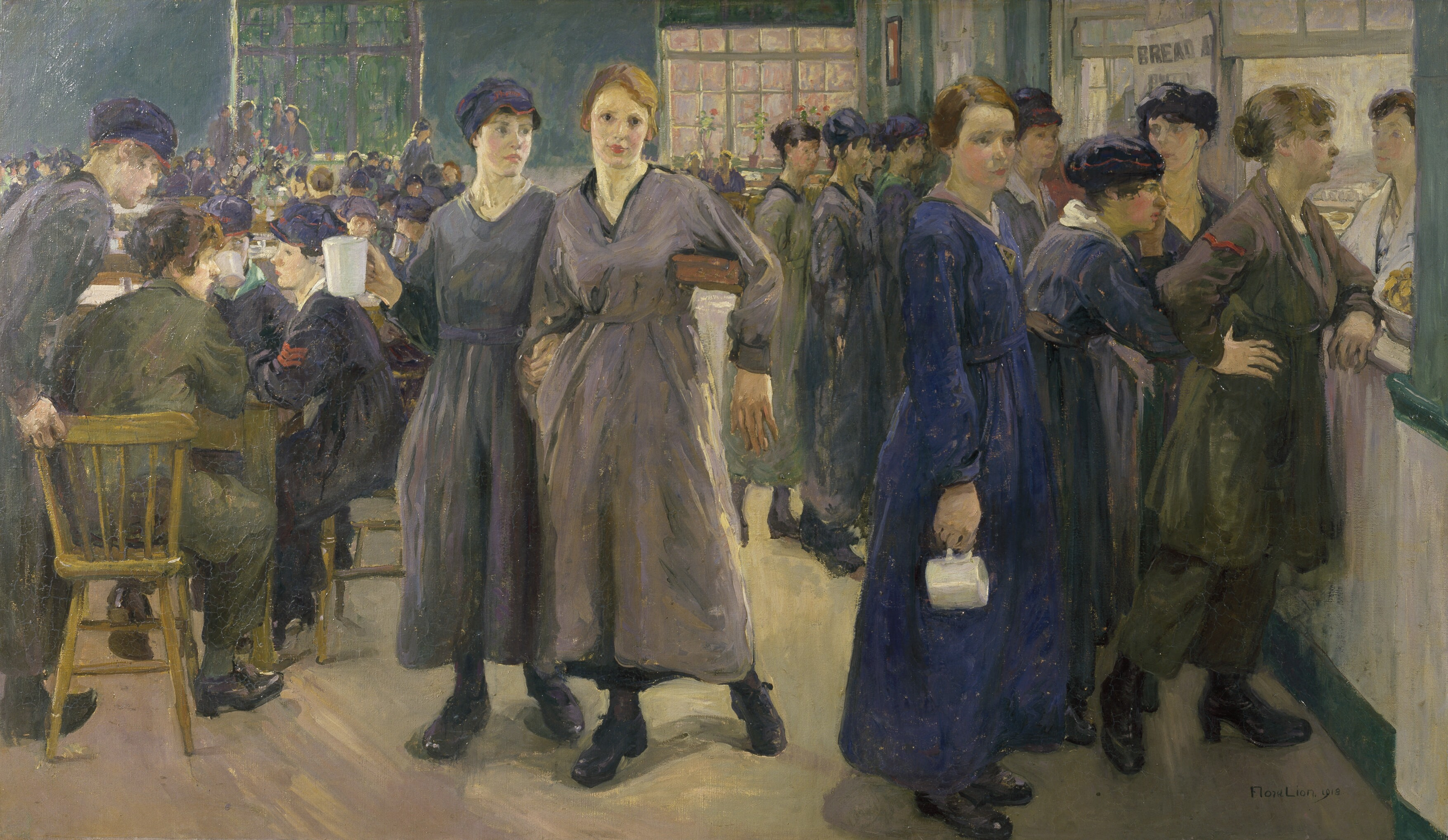
Women's Canteen at Phoenix Works, Bradford, 1918 (Art.IWM ART4434)

During World War I Lion was commissioned by the Ministry of Information, MoI, to paint factory scenes on the home front. The Ministry issued permits for Lion to paint in factories in Leeds and Bradford. In Leeds she painted in a factory where wooden flying-boats were built using traditional, labour-intensive methods.

In Bradford Lion painted women working in a munitions factory, but unusually depicted them during a meal break in their works canteen, which were a war-time innovation for Britain. Although several of the women in the painting are clearly tired the overall impression is one of great confidence among the women workers. This contrasts to Lion's portrayal of the male workers.

Both paintings were completed in 1918 by which time Ministry of Information had been wound up and the Imperial War Museum had taken over the MoI artist's scheme. However, the Museum had little, if any, money available to purchase new artworks and so refused to accept the paintings despite Lion offering them at only 150 guineas each. In 1927, with financial assistance from a patron who bought one of the paintings from Lion, the two works were presented to the Museum.

Lion was also one of three women artists, alongside Anna Airy and Dorothy Coke, considered for commissions by the British War Memorials Committee but the BWMC did not acquire any paintings from any of them.

== Later life ==
Among Lion's later commissions were a group portrait of a young Elizabeth Bowes-Lyon, Duchess of York flanked by two cousins, a portrait of the wife of the Spanish ambassador, for which she received the silver medal, 1921, from the Société des Artistes Français, the conductor Sir Henry Joseph Wood (1937); and, for a second time in 1940, Elizabeth Bowes-Lyon, by then queen-consort to King George VI. Lion was active in the women's suffrage movement and, in 1936, painted a notable portrait of Flora Drummond, a leader of the Women's Social and Political Union. During her career Lion had at least four solo exhibitions;- one at the Alpine Club in 1923, another at Barbizon House in 1929, at the Fine Art Society during 1937 and finally at Knoedler's Gallery in 1940. Ten portraits by Lion are in the collection of the National Portrait Gallery in London. Lion received the Gold Medal from the Société des Artistes Français in 1949.
