= Anna Airy =

English painter and etcher

- Born: 6 June 1882; Greenwich, London, England
- Died: 23 October 1964 (aged 82); Greenwich, London, England
- Education: Slade School of Fine Art
- Known for: Painting, Pastel, Etching
- Spouse: Geoffrey Buckingham Pocock

Anna Airy (6 June 1882 – 23 October 1964) was an English oil painter, pastel artist and etcher. She was one of the first officially commissioned as a war artist and was recognised as one of the leading artists of her generation.

== Early life and education ==
Anna Airy was born on 6 June 1882 in Greenwich, London, the daughter of Anna (née Listing) and Wilfrid Airy, an engineer who worked on Orwell Park Observatory. Her paternal grandparents were Richarda and George Biddell Airy, the Astronomer Royal. Her maternal grandfather was Professor Johann Benedict Listing of the University of Göttingen and her parents met through her grandparents' European scientific connections and married in Göttingen on 27 April 1881. Airy's German mother died a fortnight after her birth and baby Anna was raised by two of her paternal aunts, Christabel and Annot Airy.

Her aunts were both artists and encouraged her interest, as did her father who Airy later remembered promising "if I persisted in going in for art when I left school that he would give me the finest art education either in this country or on the Continent that could be had at that time, after which I must stand on my own two feet".

Airy trained at the Slade School of Fine Art in London from 1899 to 1903, where she studied alongside William Orpen and Augustus John, and under Fred Brown, Henry Tonks and Philip Wilson Steer. Airy won prizes at the Slade School for portrait, figure, and other subjects including the Slade School Scholarship in 1902. She also won the Melville Nettleship Prize in 1900, 1901 and 1902.

During her time as a student, she explored life outside her middle class upbringing, visiting gambling dens and attending prize fights. She claimed to have been in one such establishment when a murder took place, only escaping being questioned by the police by the help of a cardsharp friend. These visits influenced a number of her works such as The Gambling Club and A Cast of Dice.

== Work ==
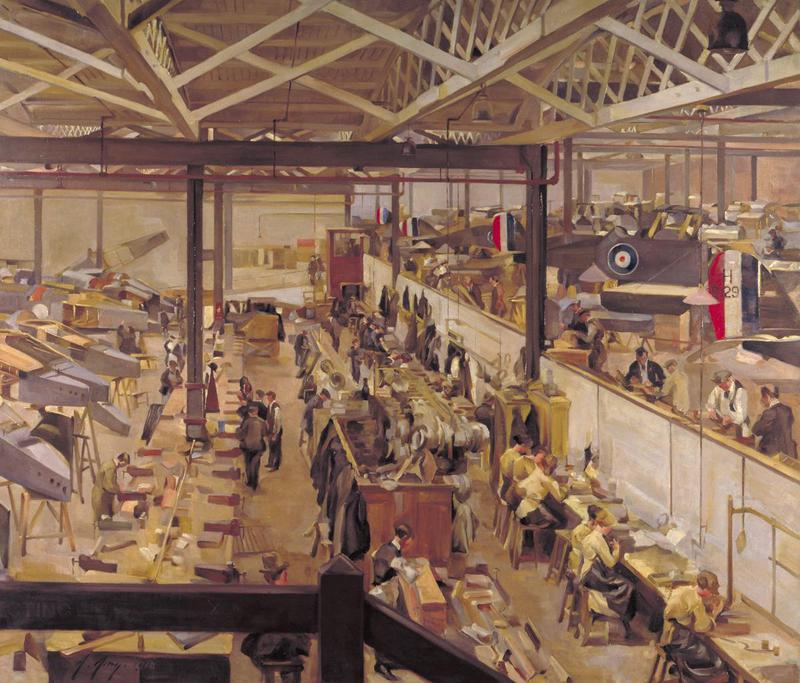
An Aircraft Assembly Shop, Hendon

During World War I, Airy was given commissions in a number of factories and painted her canvases on site in often difficult and sometimes dangerous conditions. She negotiated a fee of £250 for each of her works and the right to exhibit them to maintain her professional profile. While working at great speed to paint A Shell Forge at a National Projectile Factory, Hackney Marshes, London in an extremely hot environment, "the ground became so hot that her shoes were burnt off her feet". This painting was featured in an exhibition at the Imperial War Museum's 2011–2012 exhibition Women War Artists.

In June 1918, the Munitions Committee of the Imperial War Museum (IWM) commissioned her to create four paintings representing typical scenes in four munitions factories. These included:

- National Projectile Factory at Hackney
- National Filling Factory at Chilwell, Nottingham, W G Armstrong Whitworth's at Nottingham
- Aircraft Manufacturing Co. at Hendon
- South Metropolitan Gas Co.

The Chilwell commission was replaced by a request for a painting of work at the Singer factory in Glasgow. Airy was also commissioned by the Women's Work Section of the IWM during the war. In 1917, she was commissioned by the Canadian War Memorials Fund, and in 1940 by the Ministry of Munitions. Her work was also part of the art competitions at the 1928 Summer Olympics and the 1932 Summer Olympics.

Airy was married to the artist Geoffrey Buckingham Pocock and for many years the couple lived at Haverstock Hill in Hampstead before moving to Playford near Ipswich to the house left to her by her father Wilfrid in 1925. She worked as a teacher at Ipswich Art School.

== Exhibitions ==
Airy's work was exhibited at the Royal Academy in 1905 and in each subsequent year there until 1956. Her first one-woman exhibition having been held at the Carfax Gallery in 1908. In 1915, she was describes as "the most accomplished artist of her sex" by an art critic. Airy also exhibited at the Paris Salon and in Italy, Canada and in the United States. She has been represented in the British Museum; the Victoria and Albert Museum; and the Imperial War Museum. Her work also appeared in the Art Gallery of New South Wales, Sydney as well as in Auckland, New Zealand; Vancouver and Ottawa in Canada; and in the Corporation Art Galleries of Liverpool, Leeds, Huddersfield, Birkenhead, Blackpool, Rochdale, Ipswich, Doncaster, Lincoln, Harrogate, Paisley and Newport and North Lanarkshire.

A painting by Airy, The Golden Plum Tree, shown at a 1916 exhibition of works by female artists was acquired by Queen Mary. Her etching Forerunners of Fruit (c.1925) is in the collection of the Art Gallery of New South Wales.

Two of Airy's works, Shop for Machining 15-inch Shells: Singer Manufacturing Company, Clydebank, Glasgow 1918 and Study for ‘The L Press: Forging the Jacket of an 18-inch Gun, Armstrong-Whitworth Works, Openshaw’ 1918 were included in the Tate Britain exhibition Now You See Us: Women Artists in Britain 1520-1920 in 2024.

Five of Airy's works, Oak Apples, An Aircraft Assembly Shop, Hendon, Shop for Machining 15-Inch Shells: Singer Manufacturing Company, Clydebank, Glasgow, Scotland, Blue Tit’s Breakfast, and The Art of Pastel, were included in the Clark Art Institute's exhibit A Room of Her Own: Women Artists-Activists in Britain, 1875-1945, June 14 – September 14, 2025.

== Publications ==
Airy was the author of:

- The Art of Pastel (1930) London: Winsor & Newton
- Making a Start in Art (1951) Studio Publications London, New York

== Memberships ==
Airy was a member of several artistic societies. She was elected as a member of The Pastel Society in 1906. She also joined the Royal Society of Painters and Etchers in 1908 when the society elected her. She was also an elected member of the Royal Institute of Oil Painters (1909), Royal Institute of Painters in Water Colours (1918), and Member of the Royal Glasgow Institute of the Fine Arts (1952). She was elected as the President of the Ipswich Art Society in 1945 and had significant impact in the role which she held until her death in 1964. An annual student prize is still given in her name.

== Gallery ==
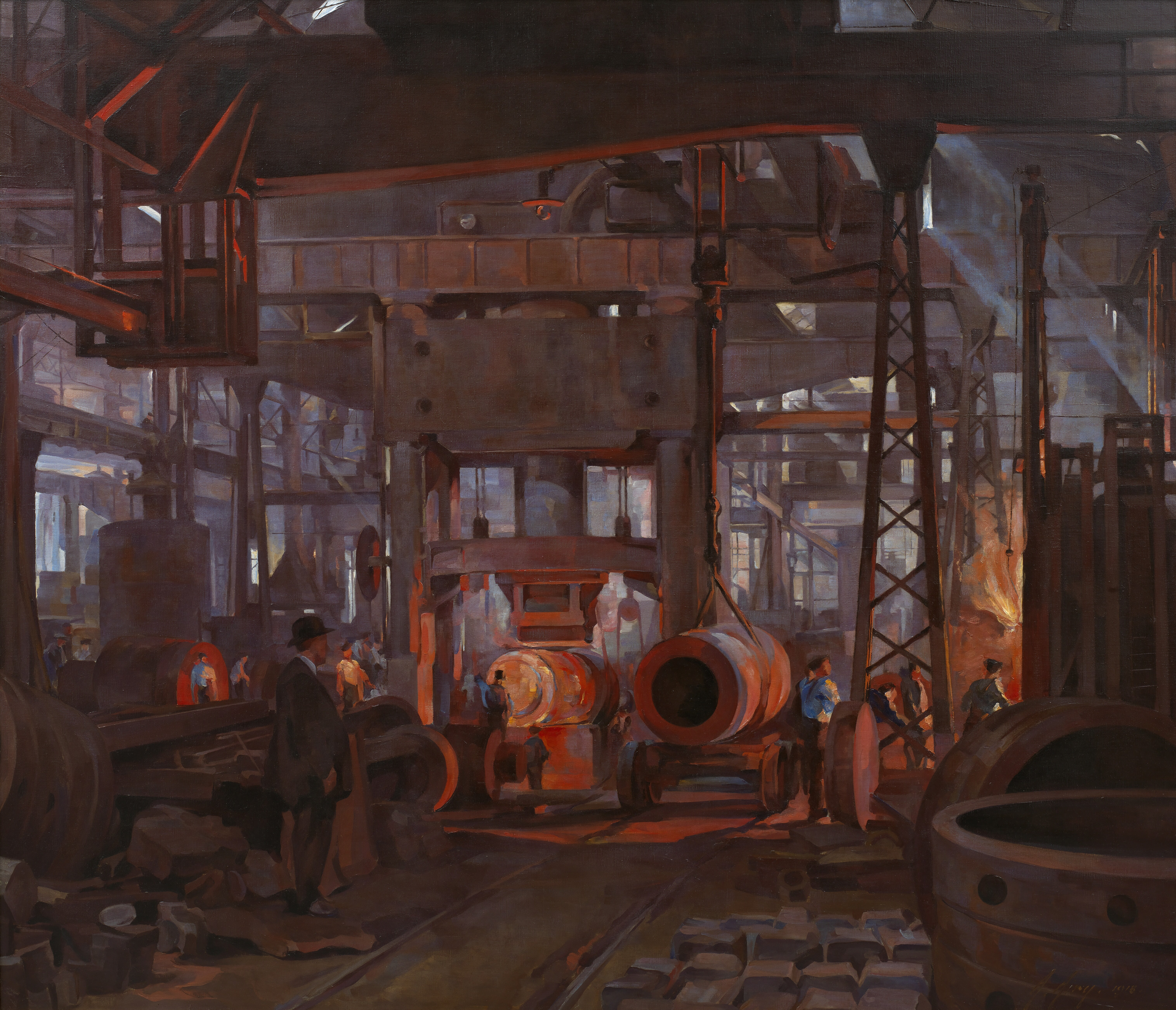
The 'l' Press. Forging the Jacket of an 18-inch Gun- Armstrong-whitworth Works, Openshaw, 1918

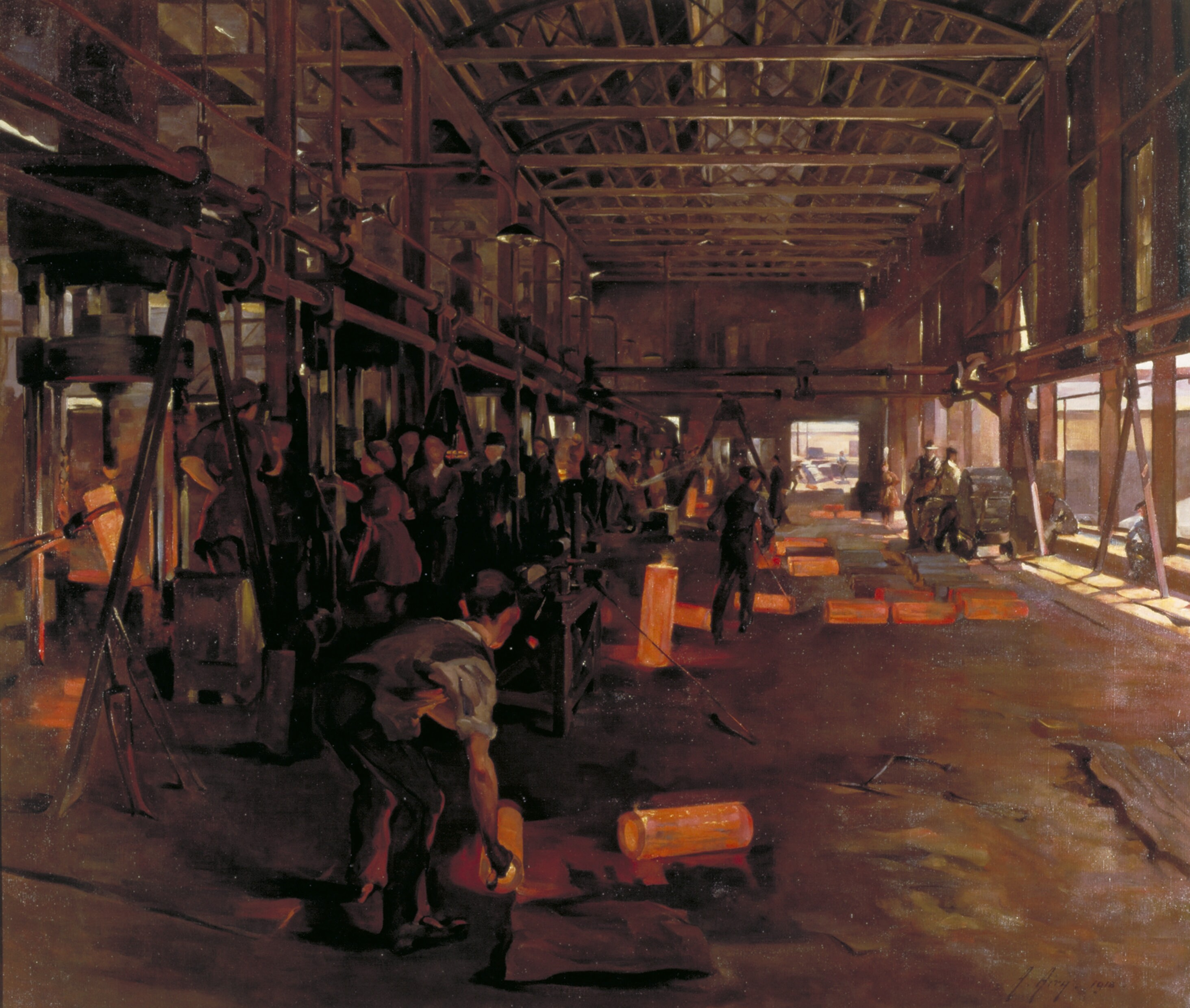
A Shell Forge at a National Projectile Factory, Hackney Marshes, London, 1918

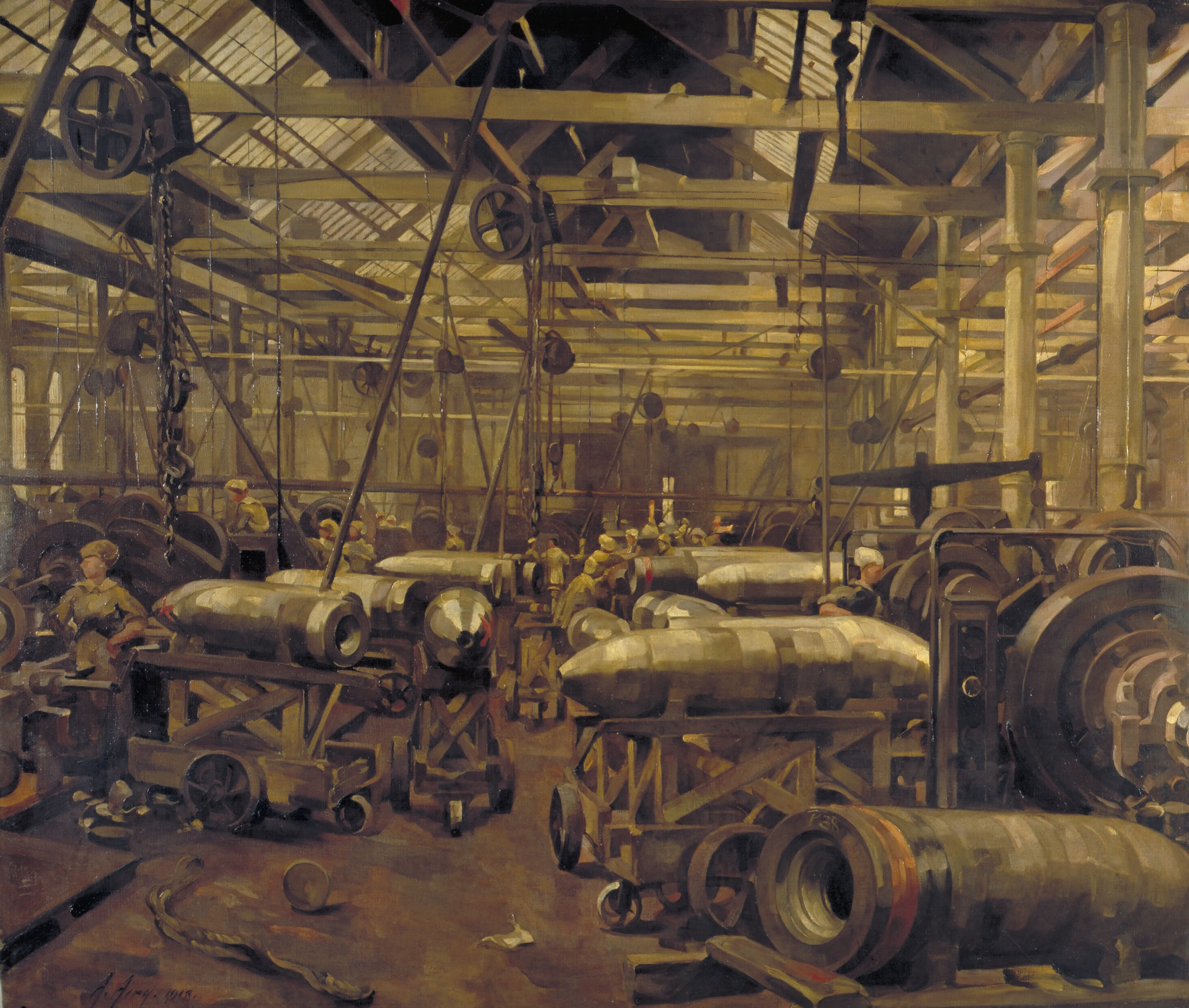
Shop for Machining 15-inch Shells- Singer Manufacturing Company, Clydebank, Glasgow, 1918

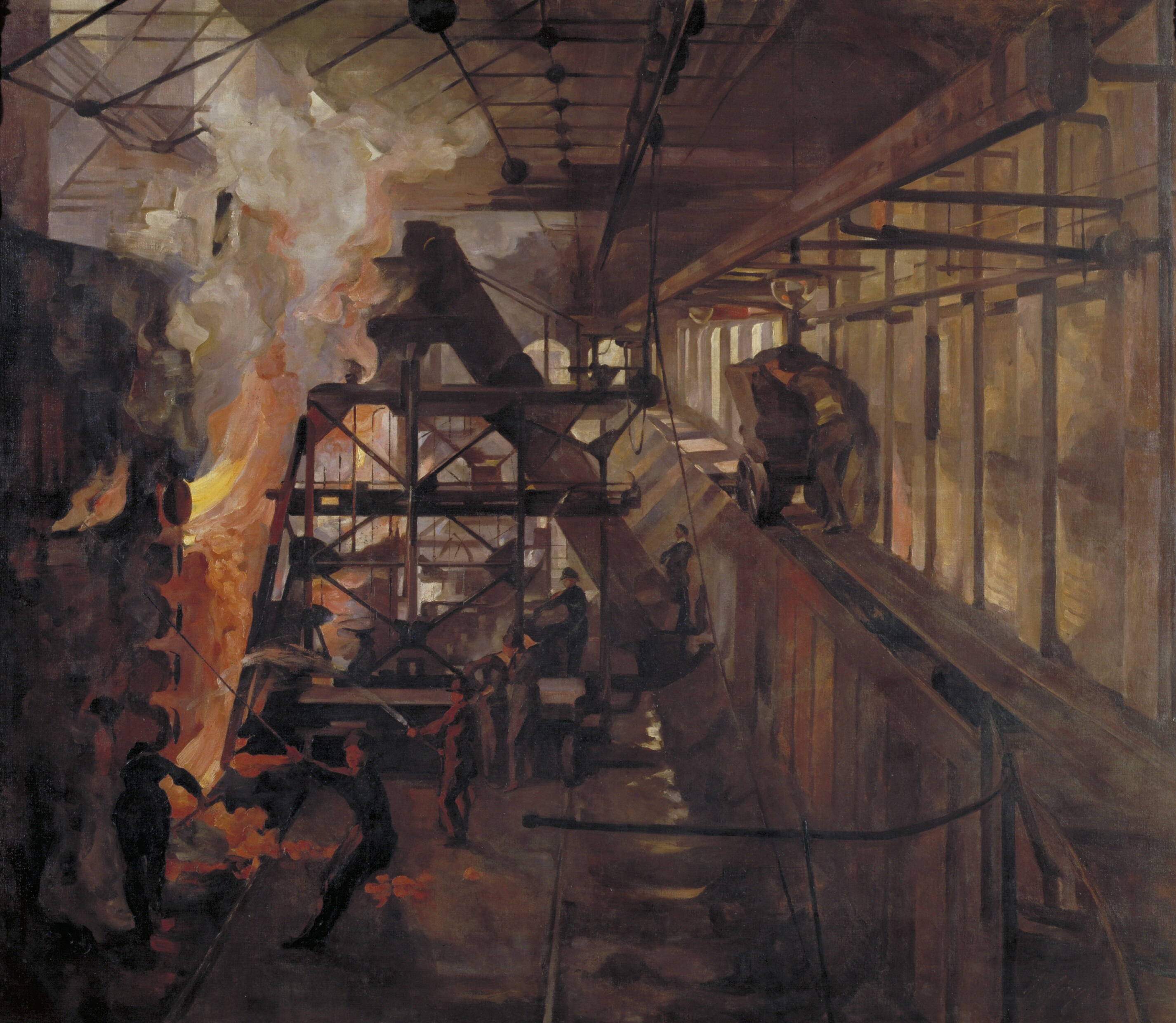
Women Working in a Gas Retort House- South Metropolitan Gas Company, London

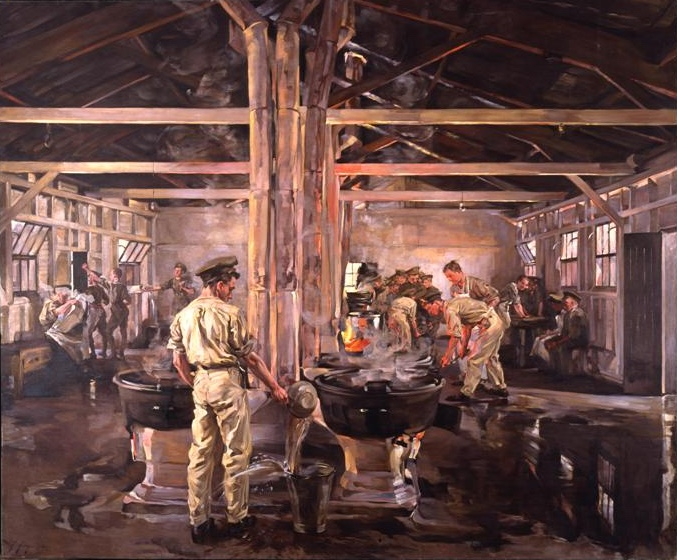
Anna Airy-Cookhouse, Witley Camp
