= British official war artists =

British official war artists were a select group of artists who were employed on contract, or commissioned to produce specific works during the First World War, the Second World War and select military actions in the post-war period. Official war artists have been appointed by governments for information or propaganda purposes and to record events on the battlefield; but there are many other types of war artist.

A war artist will have depicted some aspect of war through art; this might be a pictorial record or it might commemorate how war shapes lives. A war artist creates a visual account of war by showing its impact as men and women are shown waiting, preparing, fighting, suffering and celebrating.

The works produced by war artists illustrate and record many aspects of war, and the individual's experience of war, whether allied or enemy, service or civilian, military or political, social or cultural. The role of the artist and his or her work embraces the causes, course and consequences of conflict and it has an essentially educational purpose.

== First World War ==
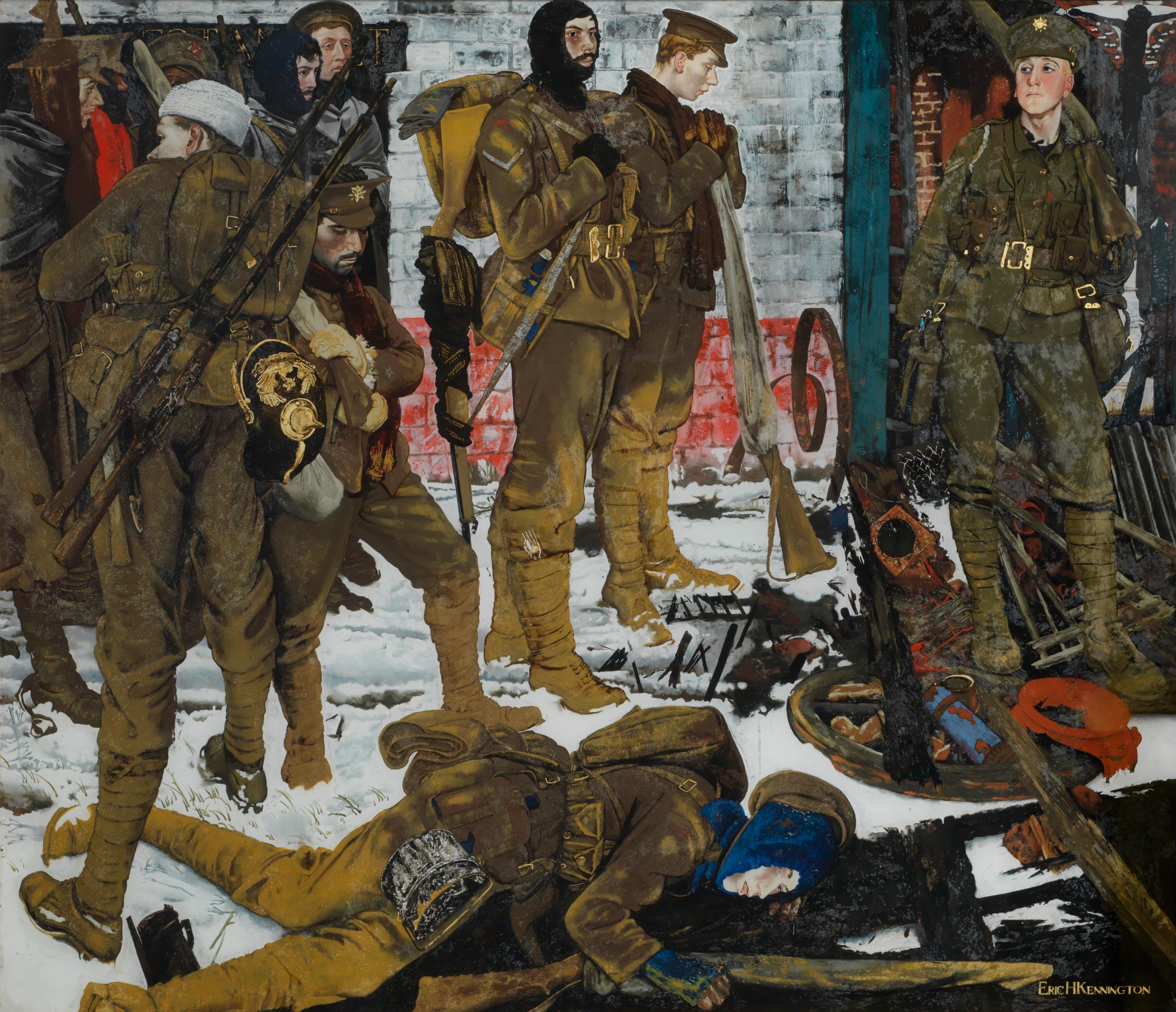
The Kensingtons at Laventie (1915)

Throughout the early years of the First World War, the British Government did not support an official war artist scheme. This began to change after artists who had served on the Western Front, such as Paul Nash and C. R. W. Nevinson exhibited paintings based on their experiences in France. The public acclaim that Eric Kennington received when his painting The Kensingtons at Laventie was first exhibited in London in April 1916 prompted Charles Masterman, head of the British War Propaganda Bureau, acting on the advice of William Rothenstein, to appoint Muirhead Bone as Britain's first official war artist in May 1916. After Bone returned to England he was replaced by his brother-in-law, Francis Dodd, who had been working for the Manchester Guardian. In 1917 arrangements were made to send other artists to France including Kennington, Nash, Nevinson, William Orpen and William Rothenstein. John Lavery and others were recruited to paint pictures of the home front.

Early in 1918, responsibility for the British war artists was passed to the British War Memorials Committee, BWMC, when the Department of Information became the Ministry of Information with Lord Beaverbrook as its Minister. Rather than focus on short-term propaganda, the main aim of the BMWC was to create a lasting memorial to the war in the form of a national Hall of Remembrance. To this end younger artists, including Stanley Spencer and Wyndham Lewis, were commissioned by the BWMC to produce a series of large artworks, After the War, when the BWMC was wound up, this series of artworks, which included The Menin Road by Paul Nash and Gassed by John Singer Sargent, became part of the Imperial War Museum collection.

== Second World War ==
The British War Advisory Scheme (WAS) was administered by the War Artists' Advisory Committee, WAAC, of the Ministry of Information. The project was devised and run by Kenneth Clark, Director of the National Gallery. When the committee was dissolved in December 1945 its collection consisted of 5,570 works of art produced by over four hundred artists, who had been employed on either full-time contracts, short-term contracts or commissions for individual works.

== Selected artists ==
=== First World War ===
- Anna Airy, 1882–1964
- David Bomberg, 1890–1957
- Muirhead Bone, 1876–1953
- Francis Dodd, 1874-1949
- Philip Connard, 1875–1958
- George Clausen, 1852–1944
- Olive Edis, 1876–1955
- Colin Gill, 1892–1940
- Adrian Hill, 1895–1977
- Francis Ernest Jackson, 1872–1945
- Augustus John, 1878–1961
- Eric Kennington RA, 1888–1960
- Wyndham Lewis, 1882–1957
- John Hodgson Lobley, 1878–1954
- John Edmund Mace, 1889–1952
- Fortunino Matania, 1881-1963
- John Nash, 1893–1977
- Paul Nash, 1889–1946
- C. R. W. Nevinson, 1889-1946
- Herbert Arnould Olivier, 1861–1952
- Sir William Orpen RA, 1878–1931
- Charles Snaffles Johnson Payne (1884–1967)
- Gerald Spencer Pryse, 1882–1956
- William Rothenstein, 1872–1945
- Austin Spare, 1886–1956
- Sir Stanley Spencer RA, 1891–1959
- Leonard Campbell Taylor, 1874–1969

=== Second World War ===
- Edward Ardizzone CBE RA, 1900–1979
- Edward Bawden RA, 1903–1989
- Stephen Bone 1904–1958
- David Bomberg 1890–1957
- Henry Carr RA, 1894–1970
- Graham Barry Clilverd, 1883–1978
- Leslie Cole, 1910–1976
- Charles Cundall, 1890–1971
- Evelyn Mary Dunbar, 1906-1960
- Amy Elton, 1904-1989 (working for the Department of External Affairs in India, 1942–1945)
- Richard Eurich, 1903–1989
- Barnett Freedman, 1901-1958
- Ethel Gabain, 1882–1950
- Charles Ginner, 1878-1952
- Duncan Grant, 1885–1978
- Bernard Hailstone, 1910-1987
- Thomas Hennell, 1903–1945
- Eliot Hodgkin, 1905–1987
- Eric Kennington, RA, 1888–1960
- Mary Kessell, 1914–1977
- Laura Knight DBE RA, 1877–1970
- L. S. Lowry, 1887-1976
- John Mansbridge, 1901–1981
- Henry Moore, 1898-1986
- James Morris, 1908-1989
- Paul Nash, 1889–1946
- Mervyn Peake, 1911–1968
- John Piper CH, 1903-1992
- Roland Vivian Pitchforth, 1895–1982
- Eric Ravilious, 1903–1942
- Albert Richards, 1919–1945
- Leonard Rosoman RA, 1913–2012
- Alan Sorrell, 1904–1974
- Ruskin Spear RA, 1911–1990
- Stanley Spencer RA, 1891–1959
- Graham Sutherland OM, 1903–1980
- Carel Weight CBE RA, 1908–1997
- Doris Zinkeisen, 1898–1991
- Anna Zinkeisen, 1901–1976

== Conflicts since the Second World War ==
Since the First World War and the Imperial War Museums' establishment of a national collection of Official War Art, the IWM has played a major role in Official War Artist commissioning. In the early 1970s, for the first time since the Second World War and the WAAC scheme, the IWM revived official commissioning with the establishment of the Art Commissions Committee (ACC) and by sending Ken Howard (artist) to cover the Troubles in Northern Ireland. This was soon followed by Linda Kitson's commission for the Falklands conflict, and has continued with many later projects, including Peter Howson's work in Bosnia and more recently Steve McQueen (director)'s work in Iraq, among others. Today the IWM's commissioning relates to all aspects of British and Commonwealth Forces' activities. Furthermore, not all commissioned artists are embedded within the military, some working with non-governmental organisations or independently.

=== IWM official war artists since 1979 ===
- Derek Eland, born 1961 (Afghanistan 2011)
- Mark Neville, born 1966 (Afghanistan 2011; commission by firstsite, Colchester, in association with the IWM)
- Steve McQueen (director) (Iraq, 2004–6)
- Langlands & Bell (Afghanistan, 2003)
- Paul Seawright (Afghanistan, 2002)
- Peter Howson, born 1958 (Bosnia)
- John Keane, born 1954 (Gulf War)
- Linda Kitson, born 1945 (Falklands War)
- Ken Howard (artist) (Northern Ireland, 1979)

== Other war artists' schemes ==
Working with the British Government and the Armed Forces, traditionally the Official War Artists' schemes have been overseen by artists (including Muirhead Bone) and art historians (including Kenneth Clark and curators from the Imperial War Museums). Yet so too have the British Armed Forces discretely appointed their own war artists to represent operations on the Home Front and in conflicts abroad, whose commissions have been vitally important for keeping an up-to-date artist's impression and record of contemporary warfare.

During the Second World War, for example, the RAF commissioned artists to make portraits of its personnel, including Battle of Britain pilots, as well as of the machinery of war – the aircraft – not with the War Artists' Advisory Committee, but independently through the Air Ministry, using a distinct RAF fund. Away from Kenneth Clark's purview (and to his annoyance), this enabled the RAF freedom to choose artists and subjects they felt celebrated their achievements and priorities. Cuthbert Orde and William Rothenstein, among others, were commissioned under this scheme to produce portraits – a genre Kenneth Clark did not much rate as a strength in British painting at that time (although with the WAAC he had commissioned Eric Kennington to produce portrait pastels for the Air Ministry as Official War Artist).

During the Second World War there were many kinds of 'war artist', besides those officially commissioned through the WAAC – such as the Firemen Artists and the Civil Defence Artists, who exhibited regularly at the Royal Academy of Arts and elsewhere in London. Women artists, furthermore, were largely overlooked for WAAC commissions, comprising around 13 percent of all artists commissioned in the Second World War, while those who received commissions, including Laura Knight, mostly worked to short-term contracts. War subjects by women artists were nonetheless exhibited and collected throughout the war, and a number were selectively purchased by the WAAC, even if not commissioned. Largely, 'women's subjects' concerned the war effort, including nursing, their work as members of the Women's Auxiliary Air Force, or as Air Raid Precautions wardens, and a number of female artists depicted ruin scenes of the Blitz. Today such works are celebrated as important examples of British war art.

Works by artists outside of official commissioning schemes have been purchased for the nation as records of modern conflict, and these are wide-ranging and insightful, shedding light on a broader range of perspectives, including those of Service personnel who make art, and of emigre or refugee artists.

Today artists work with the British Armed Forces to ensure contemporary conflicts are covered – maintaining the tradition of the artist's record – while museums continue both to commission and purchase war art for the nation.

Drumcree, The Garvaghy Road July 1997 by David Rowlands, oil on canvas, 91 cm × 61 cm

=== Armed Forces and independent war artists ===
- Cuthbert Orde (Second World War, RAF commission)
- William Rothenstein (Second World War, RAF commission)
- Frank Wootton (artist) (Second World War, RAF / RCAF commission)
- David Rowlands (Bosnia, Kosovo, Iraq, Afghanistan)
- Alixandra Fazzina (Bosnia, 1995; Army commission)
- Matthew Cook (Iraq 2004, Afghanistan, 2006-9 – 'Times Official War Artist')
- Jules George (Afghanistan, 2010, Ministry of Defence posted with the Army)

== See also ==
- Military art
- Norman Wilkinson (artist)
- War artist
- War photography
