= Laventie =

Laventie Wentie
- Commune
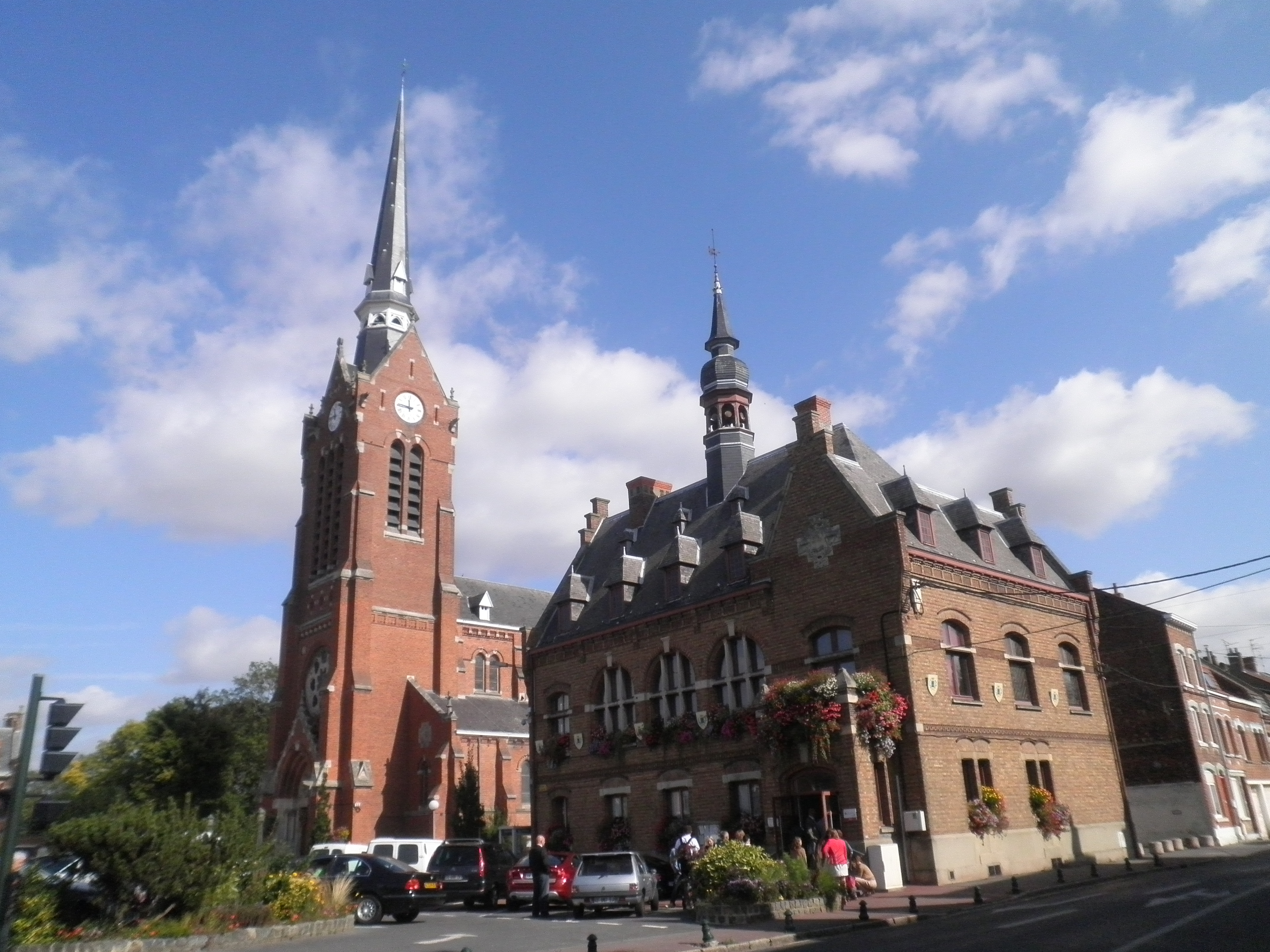
- The church and town hall of Laventie

- Coat of arms
- Location of Laventie
- Location within France Location within Hauts-de-France
- Coordinates: 50°37′42″N 2°46′19″E
- Country: France
- Region: Hauts-de-France
- Department: Pas-de-Calais
- Arrondissement: Béthune
- Canton: Beuvry
- Intercommunality: Flandre Lys

Government
  - Mayor (2020–2026): Jean-Philippe Boonaert
- Area^{1}: 18.13 km^{2} (7.00 sq mi)
- Elevation: 18 m (59 ft)
- Highest elevation: 20 m (66 ft)
- Lowest elevation: 15 m (49 ft)
- Population (2023): 5,044
  - Density: 278.2/km^{2} (720.6/sq mi)
- Time zone: UTC+01:00 (CET)
  - Summer (DST): UTC+02:00 (CEST)
- INSEE/Postal code: 62491 /62840
- ^{1} French Land Register data, which excludes lakes, ponds, glaciers > 1 km^{2} (0.386 sq mi or 247 acres) and river estuaries.

Laventie (French pronunciation: [lavɑ̃ti]; West Flemish: Wentie) is a commune in the Pas-de-Calais department in the Hauts-de-France region of France.

== Geography ==
A small farming and light industrial town, situated some 10 miles (16 km) northeast of Béthune and 12 miles (19 km) west of Lille, at the junction of the D166, D173 and D174 roads. Famous for its cherries.

== History ==
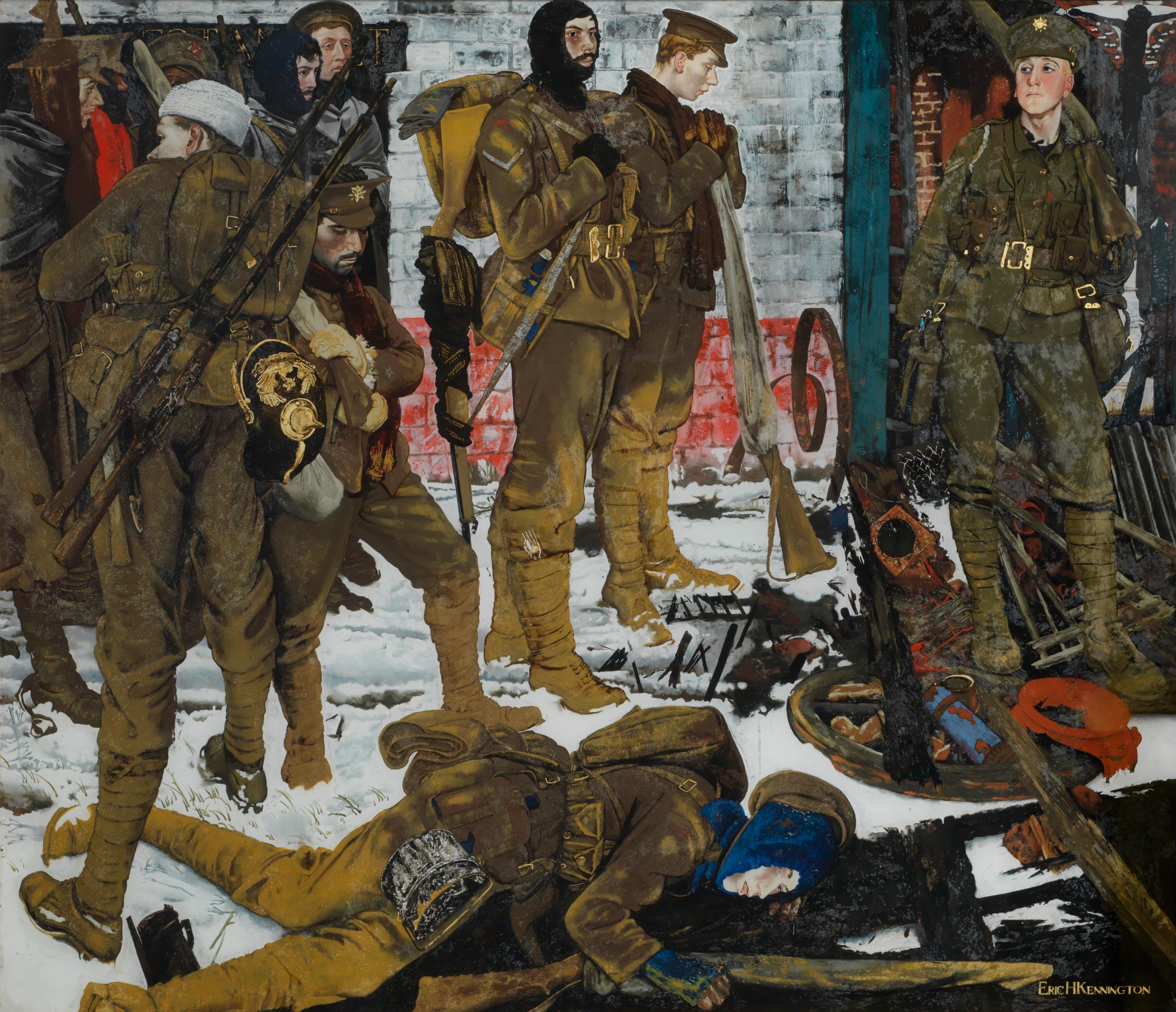
The Kensingstons at Laventie.

In World War I, like other settlements in Pas-de-Calais, Laventie was heavily fought over between German and Allied forces. From 1915, there was constant underground fighting in the area, in which units like the 173rd, 3rd Australian and 255th Tunnelling Companies RE were involved. Laventie is the title of a poem by the war poet and composer Ivor Gurney.

The artist Eric Kennington was stationed at Laventie with his unit, the 1/13th Battalion, London Regiment (Kensington), in the winter of 1914–15. After being wounded and evacuated he painted members of his platoon in the snowy village street. The painting, The Kensingtons at Laventie, considered by many to be his most important work, is in the collection of the Imperial War Museum, London.

The engineer and inventor of the Hortag agricultural spade, A S Bullock, also recalls action at Laventie in a posthumously published memoir (written in the 1970s). In particular he recalls how the area near the old fortifications was defended not by trenches (because the water table was too high) but by barbed wire entanglements, and he recounts the experience of being ordered to march across this barbed wire and take up position in a former distillery, as well as subsequently volunteering for the near-impossible task of returning to the battalion alone and taking a message back to the platoon during the night.

== Population ==
Historical population
Year	Pop.	±% p.a.
1968	2,909	—
1975	2,877	−0.16%
1982	3,415	+2.48%
1990	4,410	+3.25%
1999	4,383	−0.07%
2007	4,745	+1.00%
2012	4,924	+0.74%
2017	4,994	+0.28%
2023	5,044	+0.17%
Source: INSEE

== Places of interest ==
- The Commonwealth War Graves Commission cemeteries. Captain George McElroy, a leading ace fighter pilot of the Royal Flying Corps and Royal Air Force (KIA in 1918) is buried in Laventie CWGC cemetery. It has also been suggested that fighter ace Mick Mannock is buried in the same cemetery, as an unidentified British airman. Nelson Victor Carter, VC, is also buried here.

== Twin towns ==
- Iserlohn, Germany, since 1967

== See also ==
- Communes of the Pas-de-Calais department
- The works of Maxime Real del Sarte
