= Peter Howson =

Scottish painter and printmaker (1958)

Peter Howson OBE
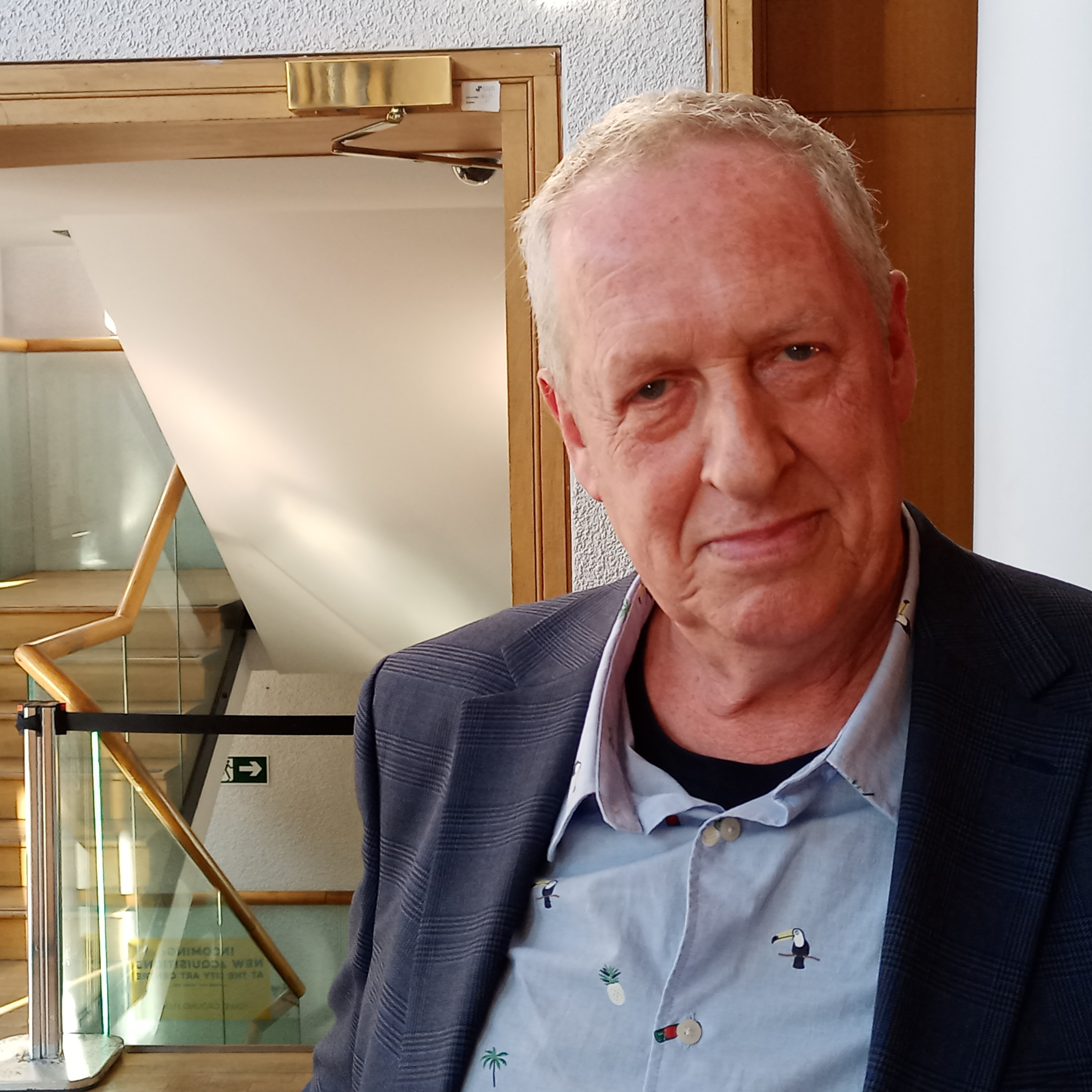
- Howson in 2023
- Born: 27 March 1958 (age 68); London, England
- Education: Glasgow School of Art
- Known for: Painting

Blind Leading the Blind III (Orange Parade), 1991.

Judas, 2002.

Peter Howson OBE (born 27 March 1958) is a Scottish painter. He was a British official war artist in 1993 during the Bosnian War.

== Early life ==
Peter Howson was born in London of Scottish parents and moved with his family to Prestwick, Ayrshire, when he was four. His grandmother gave him a small set of oil paints when he was six. He was raised in a religious family and the first ever painting he did was a Crucifixion, when he was 6 years old. At school he was bullied but found solace in art, and was greatly inspired by his art teacher, Helen Lees, who offered him extra tuition. He trained at Glasgow School of Art but was surprised to fail the first year and forced to repeat. He hated the second year in which he was asked to paint still lifes and dropped out, joining the army in 1977. He trained in the army at Glencorse Barracks near Edinburgh. After less than a year in the army he re-enrolled in Glasgow School of Art in 1979 under a Hospitalfield Scholarship, but left again in 1981 without graduating.

== Career ==
His work has encompassed a number of themes. His early works are typified by very masculine working-class men, most famously in The Heroic Dosser (1987). Later, in 1993, he was commissioned by the Imperial War Museum of London, to be the official war artist for the Bosnian War. Here he produced some of his most shocking and controversial work detailing the atrocities which were taking place at the time, like Plum Grove (1994). One painting in particular, Croatian and Muslim, detailing a rape created controversy partly because of its explicit subject matter but also because Howson had painted it from the victims' accounts. He was the official war painter at the Kosovo War for the London Times. In 1996 the University of Strathclyde awarded him a Doctor of Letters.

In 1999 he returned to Bosnia both to counter public opinion regarding his earlier comments and to purge his own personal demons encountered on his first visit. The second period affected him deeply, seeing many atrocities.

In more recent years his work has exhibited strong religious themes which some say is linked to the treatment of his alcoholism and drug addiction at the Castle Craig Hospital in Peebles in 2000, after which he converted to Christianity. An example of this is Judas (2002) which

"...is a key work from the series of paintings conveying the artist's decline into and recovery from alcohol and drug addiction and his new found faith in Christianity."

— Art Fund.org, Website

His work has appeared in other media, with his widest exposure arguably for a British postage stamp he did in 1999 to celebrate engineering achievements for the millennium. In addition his work has been used on album covers by Live (Throwing Copper), The Beautiful South (Quench) and Jackie Leven (Fairytales for Hardmen).

Howson was appointed Officer of the Order of the British Empire (OBE) in the 2009 Birthday Honours for services to the Visual Arts. In November 2010, BBC Scotland aired a documentary named "The Madness of Peter Howson" which followed the final stages of the completion of a grand commission for show in the renovated St Andrew's Cathedral and also dealt with Howson's struggle with mental illness and Asperger syndrome.

In September 2014, Howson suggested he would hand back his OBE, predominantly because of his dislike of British foreign policy but it is not clear if he ever did so.

The film Prophecy, directed by Charlie Paul and produced by Lucy Paul, is an intimate exploration of a single oil painting and the first major film to reveal the motive and techniques behind each stroke of paint Peter Howson creates. With a remarkably acute focus, the film follows the creation of Howson's painting Prophecy, its exhibition and sale, as it travels from the artist's studio in Glasgow to New York, before returning to London to enter the collection of a private buyer.

In May 2023 the Edinburgh City Art Centre gave Howson a major retrospective exhibition of over 100 of his paintings after four years of planning.

== Public collections ==
His work features in major collections including Ben Uri Gallery and Museum, Edinburgh City Art Centre, Glasgow Museums Resource Centre, Ferens Art Gallery, Guildhall Art Gallery, Harris Museum and Art Gallery, Herbert Art Gallery and Museum, High Life Highland Exhibitions Unit, Huntarian Art Gallery, Jerwood Collection, Middlesbrough Institute of Modern Art, National Galleries of Scotland, Nottingham City Museums and Galleries, Rozelle House Galleries, The Dick Institute, Fitzwilliam Museum, The Fleming Collection, Ingram Collection of Modern British Art and The Wilson.

== Bibliography ==
Monographs

- Berkoff, Stephen, Peter Howson, Flowers (2005)
- Heller, Robert, Peter Howson, Momentum (2003)
- Jackson, Allan, A Different Man, Mainstream Publishing (1997)
- Heller, Robert, Peter Howson, Mainstream Publishing (1993)

Exhibition Catalogues

- Harrowing of Hell, 24 October - 22 November 2008, Flowers East
- Christos Aneste, 18 March - 7 May 2005, Flowers East
- Inspired by the Bible, 6–20 August 2004, New College, Edinburgh
- The Stations of the Cross, 11 April - 18 May 2003, Flowers East
- The Third Step, 13 April - 4 June 2002, Flowers East
- The Rake's Progress, 12 January - 11 February 1996, Flowers East
- Blind Leading the Blind, 9 November- 8 December 1991, Flowers East
