= The Kensingtons at Laventie =

1915 painting by Eric Kennington

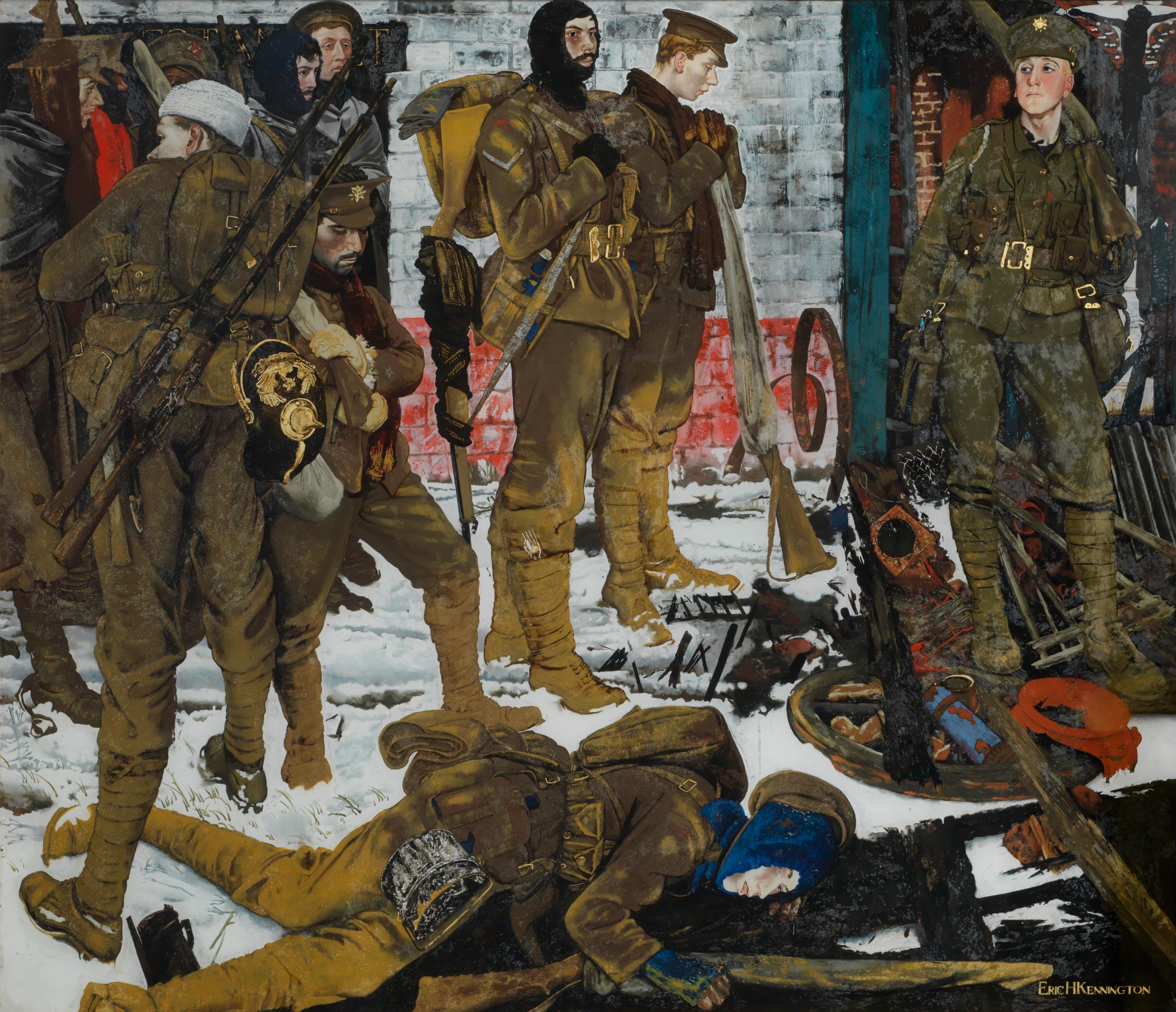
- Artist: Eric Kennington
- Year: 1915
- Type: Oil on glass
- Dimensions: 139.7 cm × 152.4 cm (55.0 in × 60.0 in)
- Location: Imperial War Museum, London
- Website: Art. IWM ART 15661

The Kensingtons at Laventie is a large oil painting on glass by Eric Kennington completed in 1915 that depicts a First World War platoon of British troops. The group depicted was Kennington's own infantry platoon; Platoon No 7, C Company, the 1/13th (County of London) Battalion, the London Regiment (Kensington), who were commonly known as the Kensingtons. Kennington completed the painting having been invalided out of the British Army due to wounds suffered on the Western Front in early 1915.

The painting is Kennington's most famous work. It has been described as "one of the iconic images of the First World War", and is held by the Imperial War Museum. When it was first exhibited in 1916, the painting had a large impact and hastened the establishment of an official British scheme for war artists.

== Background ==
On 6 August 1914, days after the outbreak of the First World War, Kennington enlisted with the 1/13th (Kensington) Battalion of the London Regiment, as their recruiting office was the nearest one to his London studio. After several months of training in England, he fought with his battalion on the Western Front from November 1914, but was wounded in January 1915. One toe of Kennington's left foot was amputated, and he was fortunate not to lose a foot due to a subsequent infection. He spent four months in hospital in London and Liverpool before being discharged as unfit for further service in June 1915. After his convalescence, he spent six months painting The Kensingtons at Laventie.

During his few months of active service before he was wounded, Kennington's unit suffered 127 casualties, approximately 20 per cent of its original strength; by the time he completed the painting, 90 per cent of the 700 soldiers who arrived in France with the battalion in late 1914 had been killed or wounded.

== Description ==
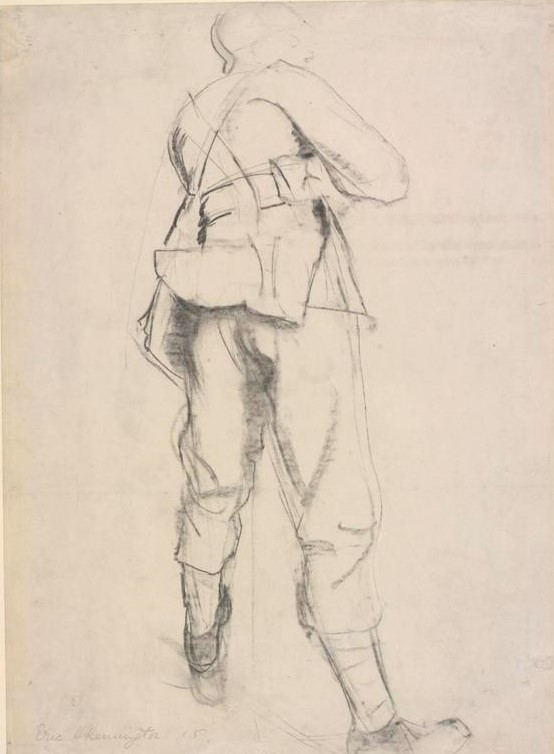
Standing Soldier – study for The Kensingtons at Laventie, (Art.IWM ART 15924)

The Kensingtons spent the extremely cold winter of 1914 in the front-line trenches forward of the village of Laventie in the Pas-de-Calais. Their trenches were poorly built and frequently under artillery fire. The painting depicts a moment when the platoon, having spent four days and nights in a forward fire trench, have made their way through a flooded communications trench to the ruined village of Laventie. The men are waiting for the order to 'fall in' for the 5 mile march to an overnight billet outside shelling range.

The painting is a group portrait of nine soldiers from Kennington's own infantry platoon, Platoon No 7, C Company. Kennington went to great lengths to contact his former comrades and sketch them while preparing the painting. It depicts eight figures standing on the snow-covered ground amid the detritus of war, beside a whitewashed wall, seven in a loose group to the left and one alone on the right overlooked by a calvary cross in the top right corner, while a ninth lies on the ground, exhausted.

Kennington supplied extensive notes that identified each individual in the painting and explained the situation depicted. The men depicted, from left to right, are:

- Private H Bristol, wearing the red scarf;
- Private A McCafferty, with a bandaged head. One of the two rifles on his back belonged to a Private Perry who had been killed by a sniper whilst beside McCafferty in a trench at La Rue Tilleloy and a German Pickelhaube helmet is attached to his belt;
- Kennington is third from the left, wearing a balaclava;
- Private W Harvey;
- Private P A Guy, nicknamed 'Good Little Guy';
- Lance-Corporal H 'Tug' Wilson, wearing a balaclava and with his fork and spoon tucked into his puttee;
- Private M Slade, standing with both hands on his rifle;
- Corporal J Kealey;
- The figure on the ground in the forefront of the painting is Private 'Sweeney' Todd, an under-age soldier who Kennington wrote was "exhausted by continual service, hard work, lack of sleep, long hours of 'standing to' and observing".

== Composition ==
Kennington painted the picture in a highly unconventional manner, painting in reverse on glass with the exterior layers applied first and the background last. This method, and Kennington's use of gold to pick out metallic details, gives the painting a particular clarity and luminosity. Whereas an oil painting on canvas will fade with time as the oils sink into the canvas, an oil on glass painting will largely retain its original brightness. Kennington claimed to have travelled some 500 miles while painting the picture in walking from the back of the glass to the front to check the composition.

The style of the painting has been compared to the Pre-Raphaelites, Pieter Breughel, and religious icons in the Russian Orthodox tradition; and its composition bears resemblance to Uccellos Battle of San Romano.

== Reception ==
The painting was first exhibited at the Goupil gallery on Regent Street from April to July 1916, to raise funds for the Star and Garter Building Fund. Its portrayal of exhausted soldiers caused a sensation. The painting was widely praised for its technical virtuosity, iconic colour scheme, and its "stately presentation of human endurance, of the quiet heroism of the rank and file", showing the war "in all its squalor and glory". The success of the painting led to the establishment of an official British war artist scheme by the Department of Information. Kennington himself was appointed a war artist and returned to France in 1917. In support of his application to become a war artist, the painter Sir John Lavery wrote "Mr Kennington, in my opinion, has painted in “The Kensingtons”, the only picture of the Great War that I have seen so far that will actually live."

In May 2015, the Royal Mail issued a stamp featuring a detail from the painting as part of a First World War commemorative set.
