= Thomas Benjamin Kennington =

English painter

Thomas Kennington
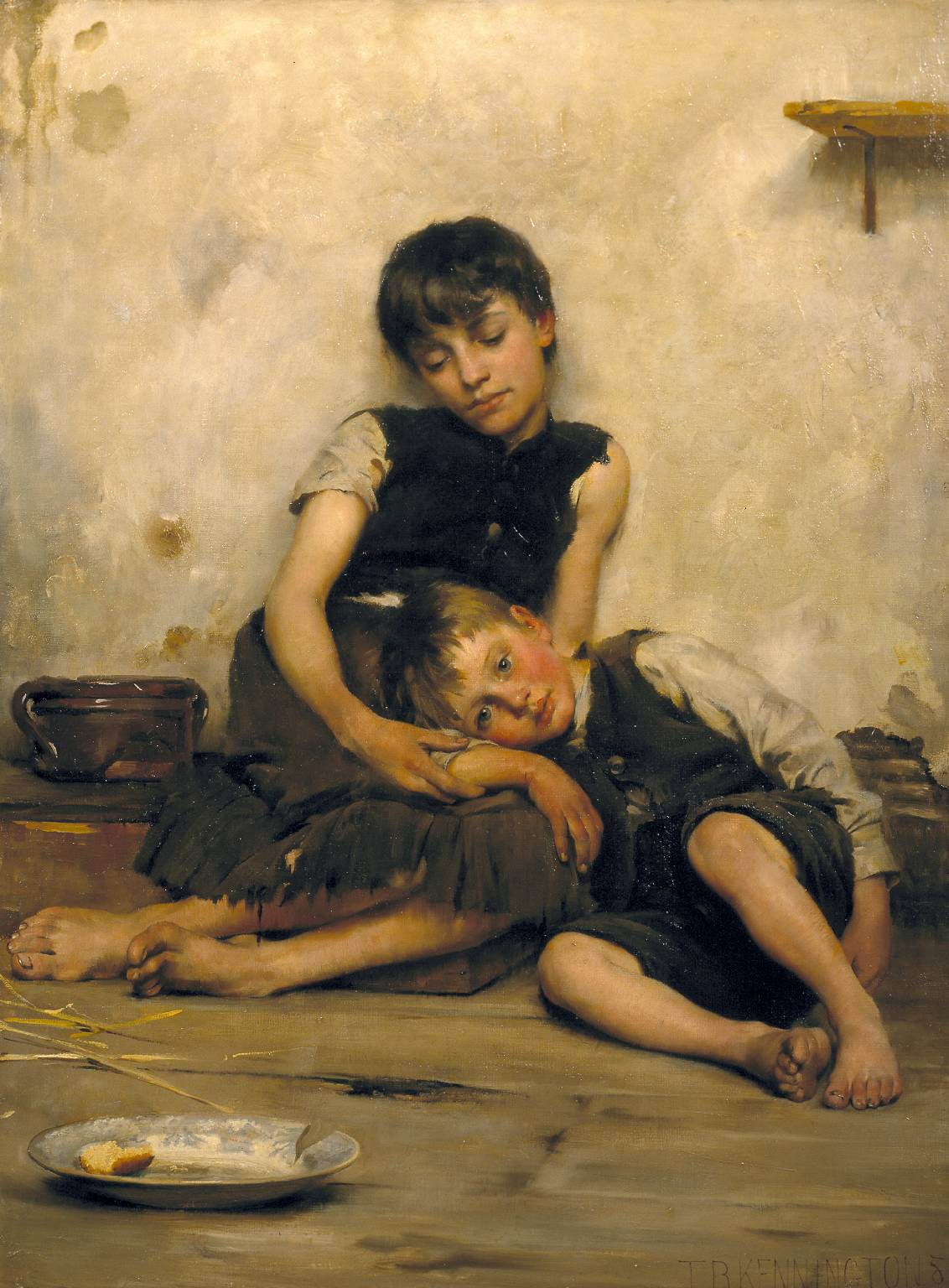
- Orphans (1885)
- Born: Thomas Benjamin Kennington; 7 April 1856; Grimsby, Lincolnshire, England
- Died: 10 December 1916 (aged 60); London, England
- Occupation: Painter
- Children: Eric Kennington

Thomas Benjamin Kennington (7 April 1856 – 10 December 1916) was a British genre, social realist and portrait painter. He was a founder member of the New English Art Club (NEAC) and the Imperial Arts League.

== Life and works ==
Kennington was born in Grimsby in Lincolnshire and trained in art at the Liverpool School of Art (winning a gold medal), the Royal College of Art (RCA) in London, and the Académie Julian in Paris, where he studied under Bougereau and Robert-Fleury. He later moved to Chelsea in London.

He exhibited at the Royal Academy, London from 1880 to 1916, and also regularly showed his work at the Royal Society of British Artists (RBA) in Suffolk Street and the Grosvenor gallery. He was a founder member and first secretary of the New English Art Club (from 1886), and also founded the Imperial Arts League, whose stated purpose was to "protect and promote the interests of Artists and to inform, advise and assist...". He won a bronze medal at the Exposition Universelle of 1889.

Kennington became known not only for his idealised paintings of domestic and everyday-life scenes but also for his social realist works. Paintings such as Orphans (1885, Tate, London), Widowed and fatherless (1885), Homeless (1890), and The pinch of poverty (1891), depicted the harsh realities of life for the poor in Britain in a manner that played on the onlooker's emotions. It has been suggested that he may have been influenced by the Spanish painter Murillo (1618–1682), whose work also featured street children. He painted in both oils and watercolour.

Kennington died in London on 10 December 1916. His son Eric Kennington (1888–1960) was also an artist, illustrator and sculptor.

== Gallery ==
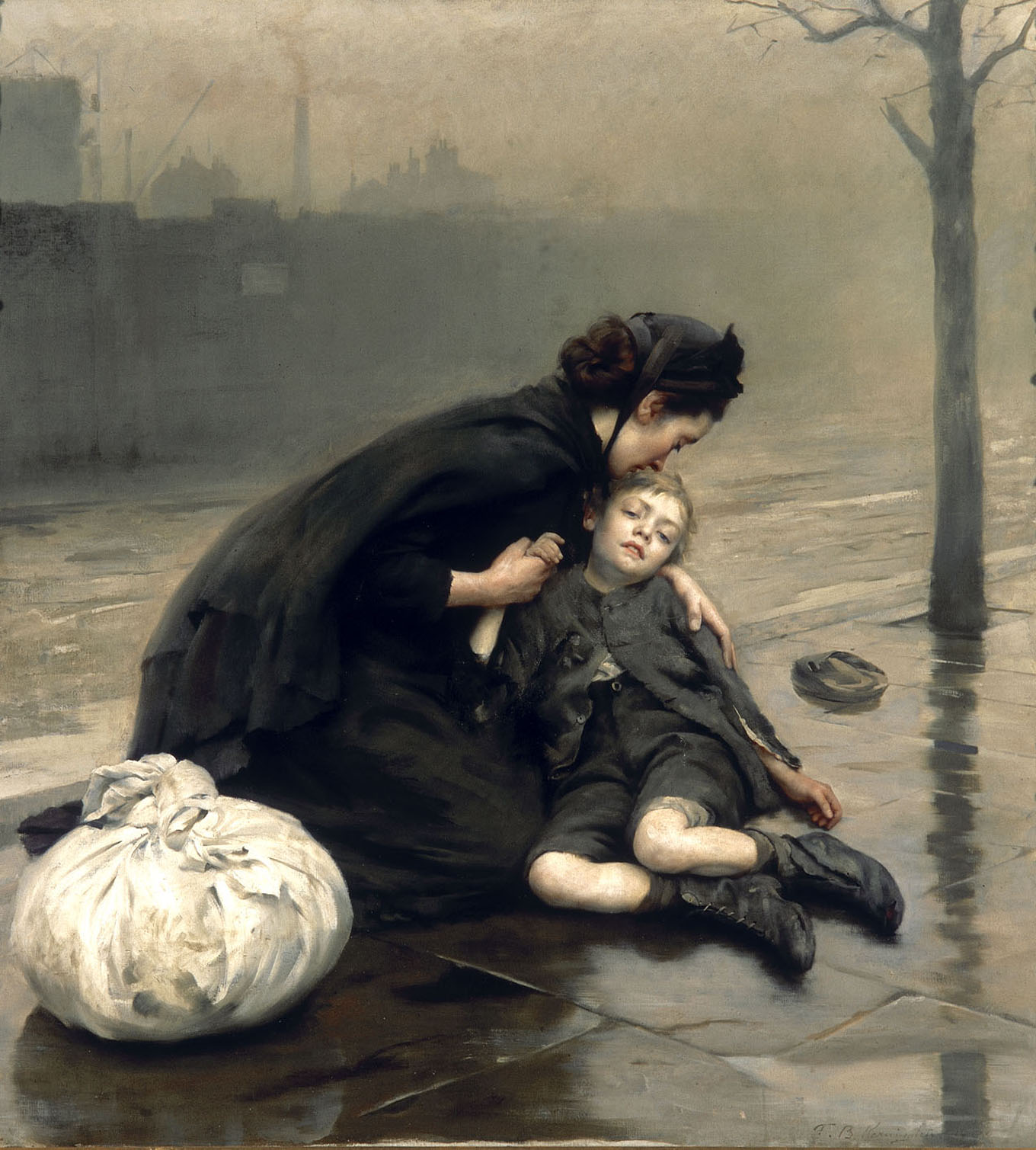
Homeless (1890)

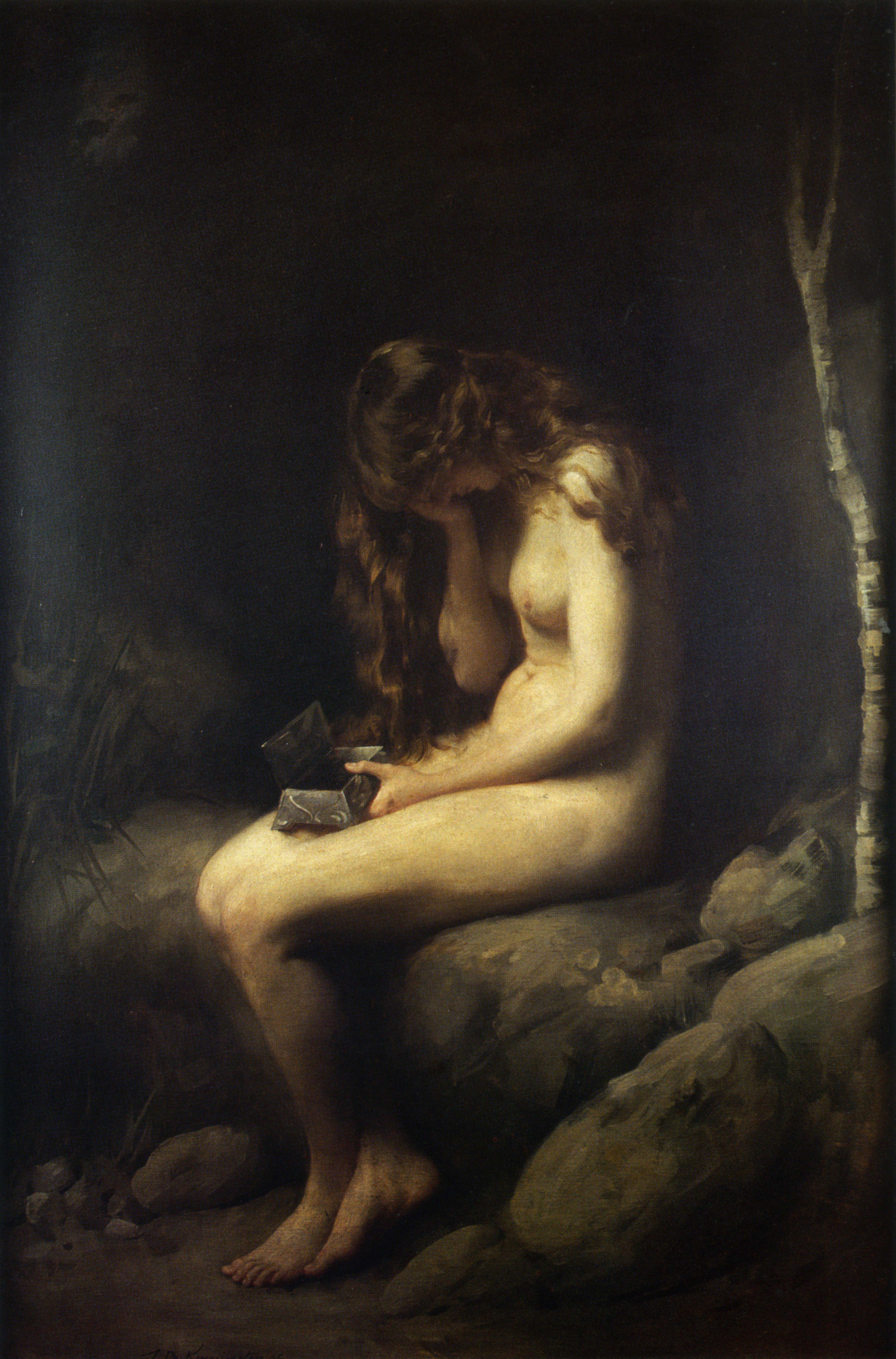
Pandora (1908)

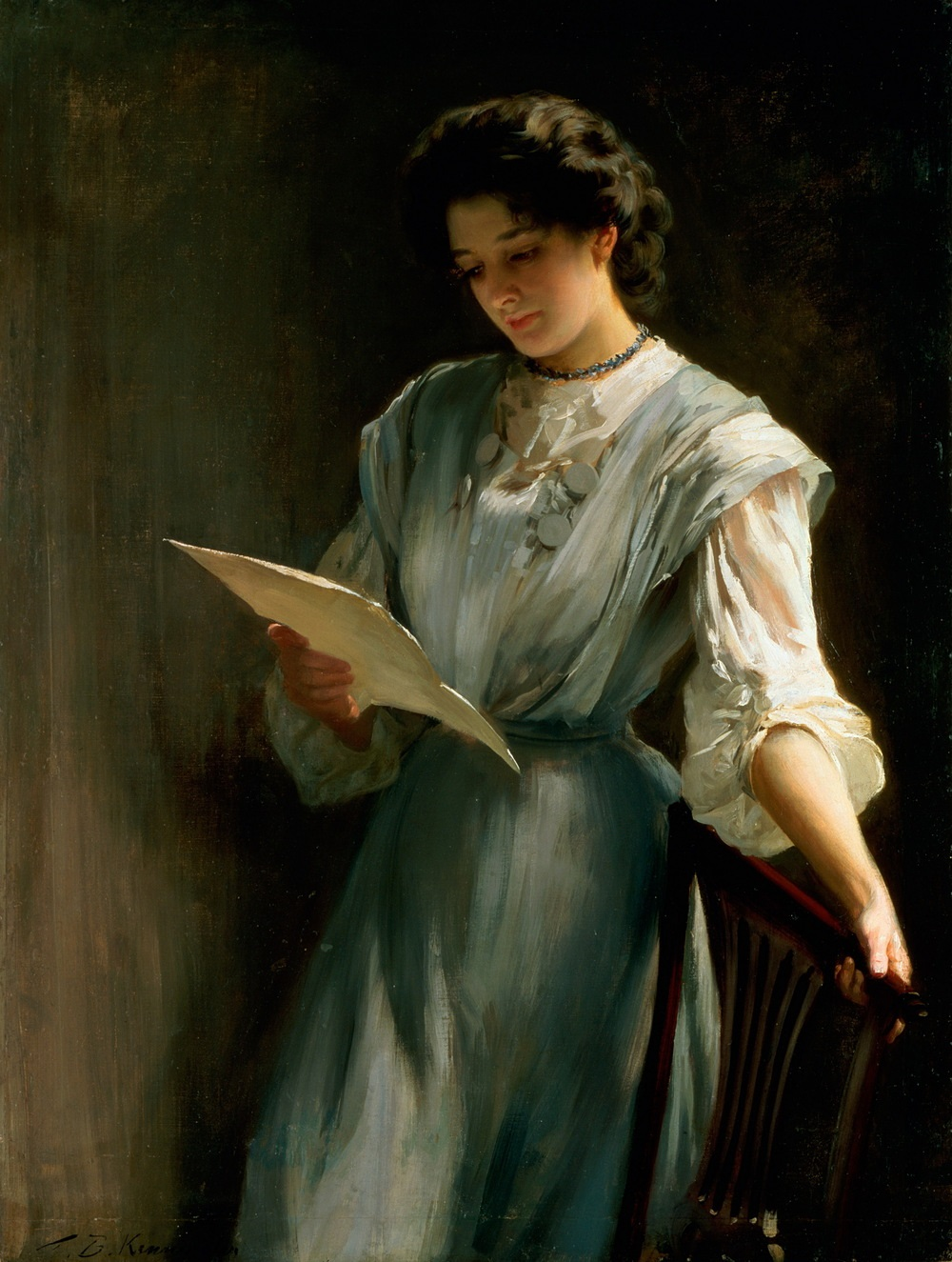
Reading the Letter (1885)

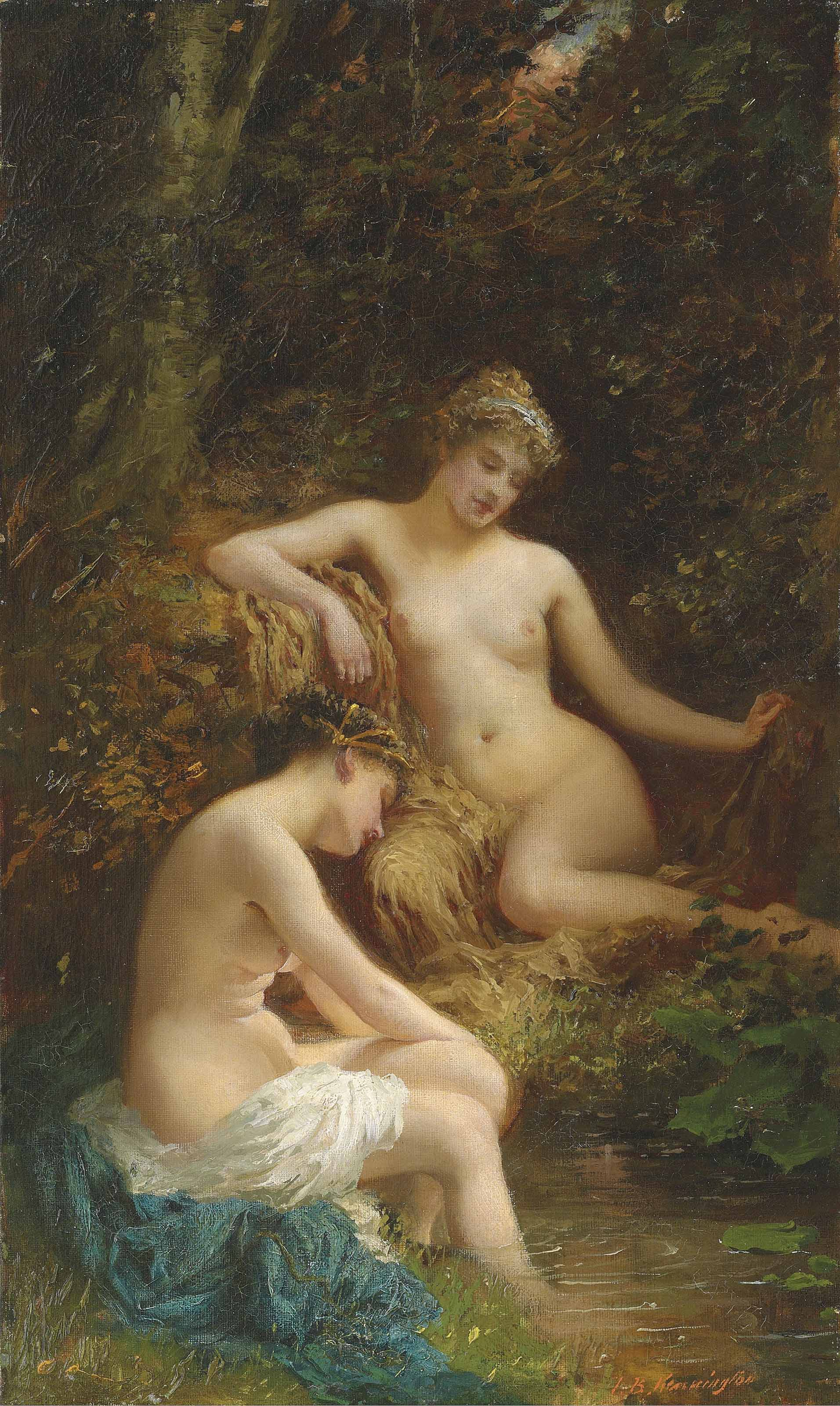
The Bathers (n.d.)

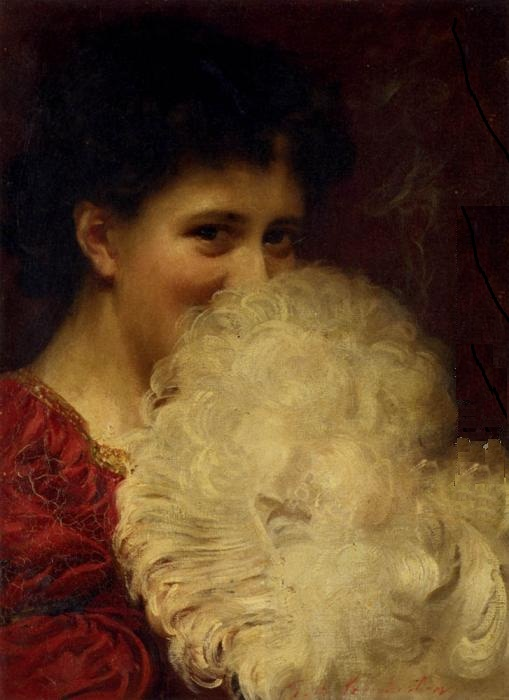
A Plume of Smoke (n.d.)
