= Ullswater Community College =

Secondary school in Penrith, UK

Location
- Wetheriggs Lane; Penrith, Cumbria, CA11 8NG; England; 54°39′34″N 2°44′57″W

Information
- Type: Foundation School
- Established: 1980 (as Ullswater High School)
- Local authority: Westmorland and Furness
- Department for Education URN: 112393 Tables
- Ofsted: Reports
- Headteacher: Stephen Gilby
- Gender: Coeducational
- Age: 11 to 18
- Enrolment: 1550
- Colour
- Website: https://www.ullswatercc.co.uk

Ullswater Community College (UCC) is a large mixed comprehensive school in Penrith, Cumbria. It currently has around 1520 students, including about 200 in the sixth form.

The School was formed under the name of Ullswater High School in 1980, when Tynefield (girls) and Ullswater (boys) secondary modern schools merged. The school still has two sets of all facilities (two halls, two gyms, two kitchens) and there is still the 'mixed yard' in the middle of the school.

The two main blocks of the school consist of the former schools, now renamed Cumberland block and Westmorland block, named after the historic counties Cumberland and Westmorland that became Cumbria in 1974. Along with Eamont Block for students with learning disabilities, Eden Block, Resources and Rural Science blocks

The character of the school comes from two main factors. The first is its enormous catchment area, one of the largest in England at around 600 square miles. The second is the existence of its neighbour and great rival, Queen Elizabeth Grammar School ('QEGS'). QEGS is a selective school.

Mr David Robinson served as headmaster until April 2004, then the school was led by Mr Stewart Gimber as the Headteacher. Ullswater had a ‘good’ inspection in 2006, but in 2009, it was given a ‘notice to improve’ by Ofsted. In September 2009, Mr Nigel Pattinson took over the role as Headteacher. Ullswater is a Business and Enterprise College, and has many links with the local community through enterprise projects. The school also had a large adult or further education centre.

In January 2011, construction of a new training centre began, and was completed in September 2011. The new "Applied Learning Centre" was opened on 29 November 2011, by The Duke of Gloucester.
