= Nelson Victor Carter =

Recipient of the Victoria Cross

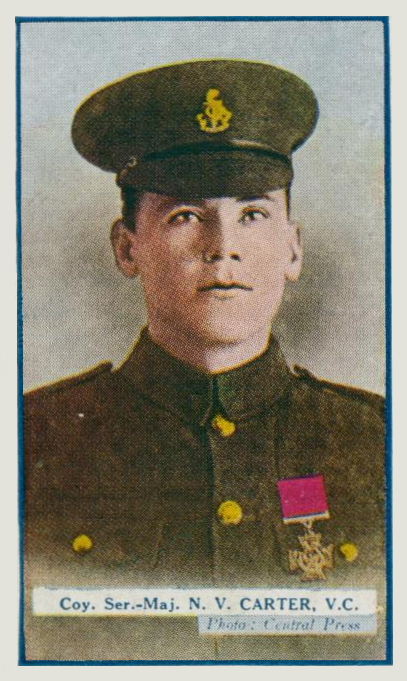
- Carter depicted on a cigarette card
- Born: 6 April 1887; Eastbourne, Sussex
- Died: 30 June 1916 (aged 29); Richebourg l'Avoue, France
- Burial place: Royal Irish Rifles Churchyard, Laventie, France
- Military career
- Allegiance: UK
- Branch: British Army
- Service years: 1914–1916 †
- Rank: Company Sergeant Major
- Nickname: Nelson
- Units: Royal Sussex Regiment
- Conflicts: World War I
- Awards: Victoria Cross

Nelson Victor Carter VC (6 April 1887 – 30 June 1916) was an English recipient of the Victoria Cross, the highest and most prestigious award for gallantry in the face of the enemy that can be awarded to British and Commonwealth forces.

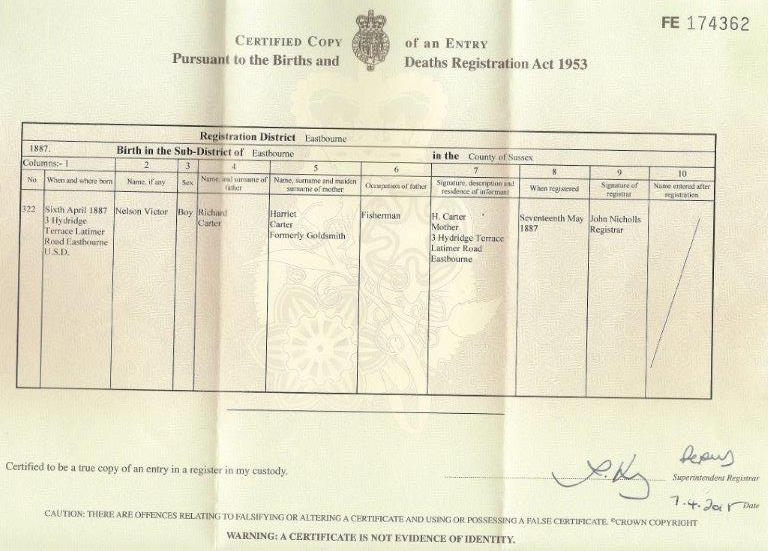
Nelson Victor Carter VC birth certificate

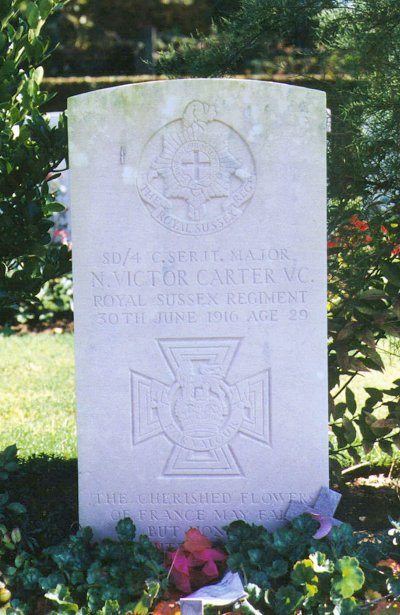
Carter's grave

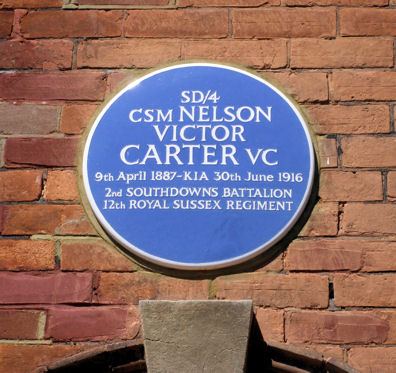
Blue Plaque commemorating Carter in Greys Road, Eastbourne

Carter was born on 6 April 1887 to Richard Carter, of Hailsham; husband of Kathleen Carter, of 33 Greys Road, Old Town, Eastbourne. His date of birth is often stated as the ninth, but his birth certificate states the sixth.

He twice enlisted in the Royal Artillery, in 1902 and 1906, both times being later discharged as medically unfit. In September 1914, after the outbreak of the First World War, he re-enlisted in the British Army, going to France with the Royal Sussex Regiment in March 1916.

He was 29 years old, and a company sergeant major in the 12th Battalion, Royal Sussex Regiment, when he died during the First World War. He was awarded the VC for his actions on 30 June 1916 at Boar's Head, Richebourg l'Avoue, France:

For most conspicuous bravery. During an attack he was in command of the fourth wave of the assault. Under intense shell and machine gun fire he penetrated, with a few men, into the enemy's second line and inflicted heavy casualties with bombs. When forced to retire to the enemy's first line, he captured a machine gun and shot the gunner with his revolver. Finally, after carrying several wounded men into safety, he was himself mortally wounded and died in a few minutes. His conduct throughout the day was magnificent.

After initial burial in a multiple grave, in the 1920s he was re-interred in the Royal Irish Rifles Churchyard, Laventie, France in Plot VI. Row C. Grave 17.

Carter's VC was presented to his widow, Catherine, by King George V at Buckingham Palace on 2 May 1917 and is now held by the Royal Sussex Regiment Museum, Eastbourne Redoubt, East Sussex. There is a blue plaque on his home at 33 Greys Road in Eastbourne.

== Bibliography ==
- Arthur, Max (2005). Symbol of Courage: The Men Behind the Medal. Chatham, England: Pan Books. ISBN 978-0-330-49133-4.
- Monuments to Courage (David Harvey, 1999)
- The Register of the Victoria Cross (This England, 1997)
- Burial location of Nelson Carter
- News Item "Nelson Carter's Victoria Cross donated to the Royal Sussex Regiment Museum"
