= 24th Division (United Kingdom) =

- Patch Insignia for 24th Division
- Active: September 1914–1919
- Country: United Kingdom
- Branch: British Army
- Type: Infantry
- Size: Division
- Engagements: First World War; Western Front; Battle of Loos; Battle of the Somme; Battle of Vimy Ridge; Battle of Messines; Battle of Passchendaele; Battle of Cambrai

The 24th Division was an infantry division of the British Army, raised in September 1914 from men volunteering for Lord Kitchener's New Armies during the First World War. After almost a year spent training in England the division was sent to the Western Front between August and September 1915. It served in Belgium and France in the trenches of the Western Front for the duration of the war.

== History ==
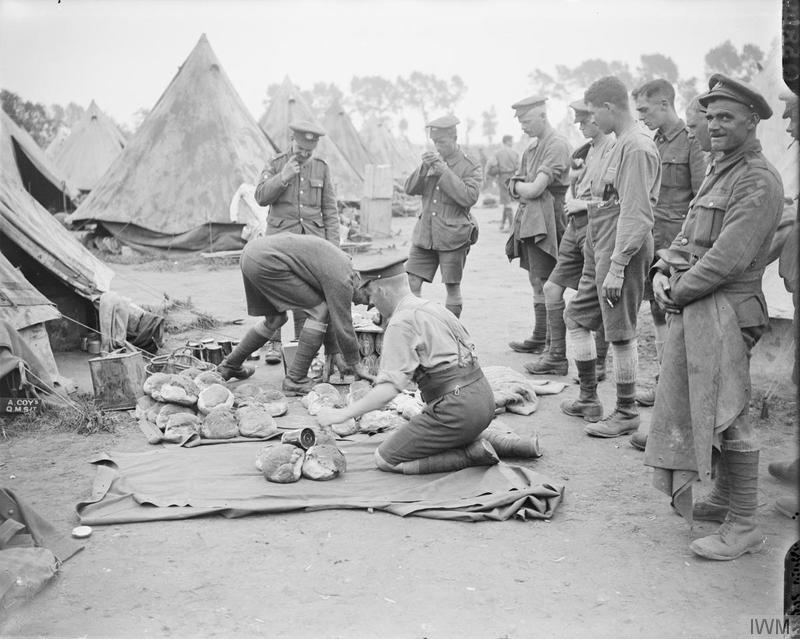
Tommies of the 7th (Service) Battalion, Northamptonshire Regiment drawing rations from the Quartermaster's stores in a camp near Dickebusch, 9 August 1917.

The division was one of the six created for the Third New Army on 13 September 1914. It moved to France in August 1915 and it saw action at the Battle of the Somme in 1916, the Battle of Passchendaele in 1917 and the Final Advance in Picardy in 1918. Shortly after its arrival in France to May 1917, it was commanded by Major-General John Capper.

It was disbanded by March 1919.

== Order of Battle ==
The 24th Division was constituted as follows during the war:

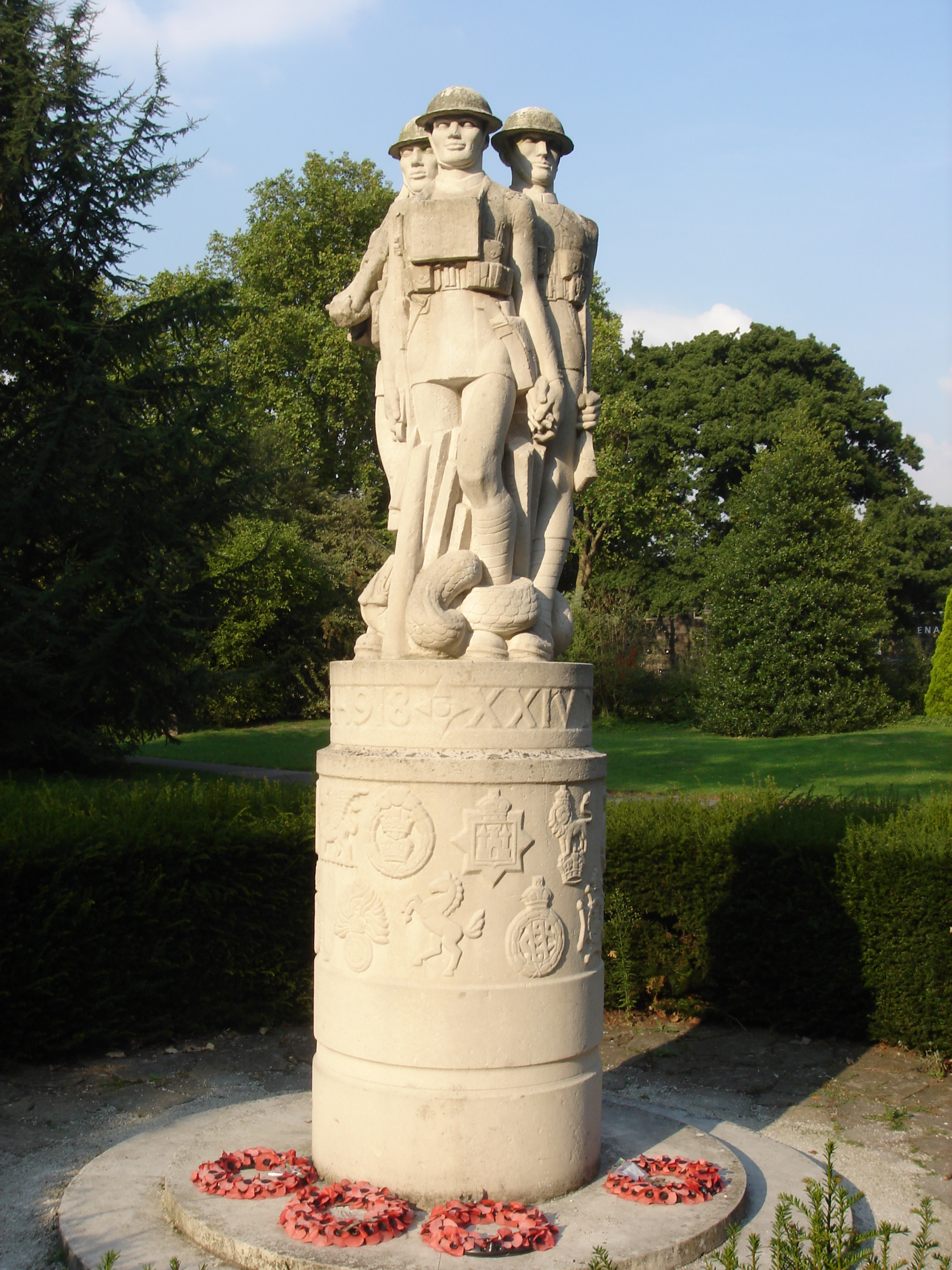
24th Division War Memorial, Battersea Park, by Eric Kennington.

71st Brigade

- 9th (Service) Battalion, Norfolk Regiment
- 9th (Service) Battalion, Suffolk Regiment
- 8th (Service) Battalion, Bedfordshire Regiment
- 11th (Service) Battalion, Essex Regiment

The brigade moved to the 6th Division in 11 October 1915, swapping with the 17th Brigade.

72nd Brigade

- 8th (Service) Battalion, Queen's (Royal West Surrey Regiment) (left February 1918)
- 8th (Service) Battalion, Buffs (East Kent Regiment) (left October 1915)
- 9th (Service) Battalion, East Surrey Regiment
- 8th (Service) Battalion, Queen's Own (Royal West Kent Regiment)
- 1st Battalion, Prince of Wales's (North Staffordshire Regiment) (from October 1915)
- 72nd Machine Gun Company M.G.C. (joined 14 March 1916, transferred into Divisional MG Battalion 5 March 1918)
- 72nd Trench Mortar Battery (joined 19 July 1916)

73rd Brigade

- 12th (Service) Battalion, Royal Fusiliers (City of London Regiment) (left October 1915)
- 9th (Service) Battalion, Royal Sussex Regiment
- 7th (Service) Battalion, Northamptonshire Regiment
- 13th (Service) Battalion, Duke of Cambridge's Own (Middlesex Regiment)
- 2nd Battalion, Prince of Wales's Leinster Regiment (Royal Canadians) (from October 1915, left February 1918)
- 73rd Machine Gun Company M.G.C. (joined 14 March 1916, transferred into Divisional MG Battalion 5 March 1918)
- 73rd Trench Mortar Battery (joined 15 July 1916)

17th Brigade

- 1st Battalion, Royal Fusiliers (City of London Regiment)
- 1st Battalion, Prince of Wales's (North Staffordshire Regiment) (left October 1915)
- 2nd Battalion, Prince of Wales's Leinster Regiment (Royal Canadians) (left October 1915)
- 3rd Battalion, Rifle Brigade (Prince Consort's Own)
- 12th (Service) Battalion, Royal Fusiliers (City of London Regiment) (from October 1915, disbanded February 1918)
- 8th (Service) Battalion, Buffs (East Kent Regiment) (from October 1915, disbanded February 1918)
- 8th (Service) Battalion, Queen's (Royal West Surrey Regiment) (from February 1918)
- 1/2nd (City of London) Battalion, London Regiment (Royal Fusiliers) (left February 1916)
- 17th Machine Gun Company (formed 17 January 1916, transferred into Divisional MG Battalion 5 March 1918)
- 17th Trench Mortar Battery (formed by 26 July 1916)

The brigade transferred from the division from the 6th Division on 18 October 1915, swapping with the 71st Brigade.

Divisional Troops

- 11th (Service) Battalion, Royal Warwickshire Regiment (joined before March 1915, left 9 April 1915)
- 13th (Service) Battalion, Royal Fusiliers (joined before March 1915, left 9 April 1915)
- 12th (Service) Battalion, Sherwood Foresters (joined before March 1915, converted to Divisional Pioneer Battalion in April 1915)
- No 3 Motor Machine Gun Battery (joined 30 October left 23 November 1915)
- 191st Machine Gun Company (joined 15 December 1916, moved into Divisional MG Battalion 5 March 1918)
- 24th Machine Gun Battalion (formed 5 March 1918)
- Divisional Mounted Troops
  - A Sqn, 1st Royal Glasgow Yeomanry (joined 30 June 1915, left 29 April 1916)
  - 24th Divisional Cyclist Company, Army Cyclist Corps (joined by 15 February 1915, left 29 April 1916)
- 24th Divisional Train A.S.C.
  - 194th, 195th, 196th and 197th Companies A.S.C.
- 36th Mobile Veterinary Section A.V.C. (joined 25 June 1915)
- 223rd Divisional Employment Company (formed by 30 June 1917)

Royal Artillery

- CVI Brigade, R.F.A.
- CVII Brigade, R.F.A.
- CVIII Brigade, R.F.A. (left 27 January 1917)
- CIX (Howitzer) Brigade, R.F.A. (broken up 3 October 1916)
- 24th Heavy Battery, R.G.A. (raised in August 1914 left August 1915)
- 24th Divisional Ammunition Column
- 13th Divisional Ammunition Column (attached 3 July to 6 August 1915)
- V.24 Heavy Trench Mortar Battery R.F.A. (joined 30 July 1916, left February 1918)
- X.24, Y.24 and Z,24 Medium Trench Mortar Batteries R.F.A. (4 x 6-inch mortars) (joined by 30 April 1916, Z.24 broken up in February 1918 and X and Y expanded to 6 x 6-inch mortars each)

Royal Engineers

- 91st Field Company (left January 1915)
- 92nd Field Company (left January 1915)
- 103rd Field Company (joined February 1915)
- 104th Field Company (joined January 1915)
- 129th Field Company (joined March 1915)
- 24th Divisional Signals Company

Royal Army Medical Corps

- 72nd Field Ambulance
- 73rd Field Ambulance
- 74th Field Ambulance
- 41st Sanitary Section (left 5 April 1917 for First Army)

== General Officer Commanding ==
The following commanded the division:

- Maj-Gen. Sir J. G. Ramsay: 19 September 1914 – 3 October 1915
- Maj-Gen. John Capper: 3 October 1915 – 12 May 1917
- Brig-Gen. H. C. Sheppard: 12 May 1917 – 18 May 1917 (Temporary)
- Maj-Gen. Louis Bols: 18 May 1917 – 12 September 1917
- Brig-Gen. E. S. Hoare Nairne: 12 September 1917 – 15 September 1917 (Temporary)
- Maj-Gen. Arthur Daly: 15 September 1917 – 31 December 1918

== See also ==
- List of British divisions in World War I
