= Derek Eland =

English artist (born 1961)

Derek Eland (born 16 September 1961) is a British artist based in the Lake District, Cumbria, England and whose practice explores what it means to be human and the impact we make on landscape. He was an official British war artist in Afghanistan in 2011 and artist-in-residence at Everest Base Camp in 2016.

== Background ==
Eland was born in Penrith, Cumbria and educated at the Queen Elizabeth Grammar School, Penrith and afterwards at Durham University where he graduated with an honours degree in Politics in 1983. Following a year as sabbatical student president at the College of St Hild and St Bede, Durham he attended the Royal Military Academy Sandhurst. He was commissioned into the Parachute Regiment in 1984 reaching the rank of captain in the Third Battalion and served in the UK, Cyprus and the Mediterranean and the USA. After leaving the Army Eland worked for fifteen years as a management consultant, firstly in the Middle East and afterwards for a number of UK Government departments.

In 2015 Eland was elected as an Honorary Fellow of the University of Cumbria.

== Art career ==
In 2009 Eland attended the University of Cumbria and gained a MA in Contemporary Fine Art. He was artist in residence for Carlisle City Council, where he created the Love Carlisle project, and after the Cumbrian Floods in 2009 became an artist in residence in Cockermouth, Cumbria.

Much of his work is created on location using 'Diary Rooms', a technique he has pioneered, and then re-contextualised in gallery settings.

In 2011 Eland was selected as an official British war artist in Helmand, Afghanistan. He was embedded with the British 16 Air Assault Brigade on the front line for a month. The resulting work was described in The Independent newspaper as "groundbreaking" and exhibited at the Imperial War Museum, Art Month Sidney and the Russell-Cotes Art Gallery & Museum. In 2014 to 2015 the work was exhibited at Middlesbrough Institute of Modern Art, where it is now in their collection. A book resulting from this work was published with the support of the Arts Council.

In 2013 to 2014 Eland worked with Bournemouth University Dementia Unit in partnership with the Alzheimer's Society and Age UK on '(Don't) Mention Dementia', a public engagement project. The work was exhibited and Eland presented an abstract about the project at the 23rd Alzheimer Europe Conference in Malta. He was subsequently a member of the UK-wide Dementia, Arts and Wellbeing Network (DAWN) at the University of Nottingham.

In April/May 2016 Eland was artist-in-residence at Everest Base Camp, a socially engaged arts project supported by the British Council. The work was covered by the world's press including the BBC and The Guardian and toured to galleries and exhibitions in the UK and overseas including at the Mountainfilm Festival in Telluride, Colorado, Kendal Mountain Festival, and The Gallery at Rheged in Cumbria.

In 2017 Eland worked with King's College London and The Great Diary Project, leading to an exhibition at Somerset House.

His studio practice is drawing- and painting-based and a reaction to his native Cumbrian landscape, rooted in his family's background in farming. As a landscape painter, Eland has exhibited widely, including at The Lowry, Salford, the Royal Cambrian Academy of Art in Conwy and the Bankside Gallery, London; for many years he had an art gallery, Gallery Number Three in Carlisle, Cumbria. His work has been shortlisted for awards and prizes including the International Celeste Art Prize in 2007, the UK Museums and Heritage Awards for Excellence 2014, and Salon Art Prize 2014.

== Other interests ==
He is a member of the Bob Graham Round 24 Hour Club, a fell running challenge.
