= Linda Kitson =

British artist (born 1945)

- Born: 17 February 1945 (age 81)
- Education: Saint Martin's School of Art; Royal College of Art
- Occupation: Artist
- Known for: Work as an official war artist during the Falklands War

Linda Kitson (born 17 February 1945) is a British artist. She is best known for her work as an official war artist during the Falklands War.

== Early life ==
Kitson studied at Saint Martin's School of Art and the Royal College of Art, where she specialised in illustration. She then taught at Camberwell College of Arts, Chelsea College of Art and Design the City and Guilds Art School and the Royal College of Art.

== Falklands conflict ==
Kitson was commissioned by the Artistic Records Committee of the Imperial War Museum as the official war artist for the Falklands Task Force. She is the first female artist to have been officially commissioned to accompany troops in battle.

In May 1982, Kitson sailed to the Falklands with 3,000 men on the Queen Elizabeth 2 and later the SS Canberra, arriving on 3 June 1982. She followed British forces across the island to Stanley, usually three or four days behind the action. Over a period of three months, under conditions of sleet, hail, snow, mud and sub-zero temperatures, and working at speed, she made over 400 drawings in conté crayon. She drew continuously, recording training and preparation; the transfer at South Georgia to SS Canberra, the landings at San Carlos Bay, the deployment of the forces to Goose Green, Fitzroy, Darwin, and Port Stanley. Following the ceasefire in June, she drew the aftermath of the fighting. She captured the daily life of the troops and the conditions under which they had to operate, showing all aspects of the conflict except the fighting.

After the re-taking of the Falklands, Kitson returned to Britain with the Welsh Guards and Royal Engineers.

Many of Kitson's drawings are now part of the Imperial War Museum’s art collection, and were exhibited to the general public in November 1982. They were featured again in the Museum's exhibition Women War Artists, in 2011-2012.
