= Portrait of Woodrow Wilson =

Painting by John Singer Sargent

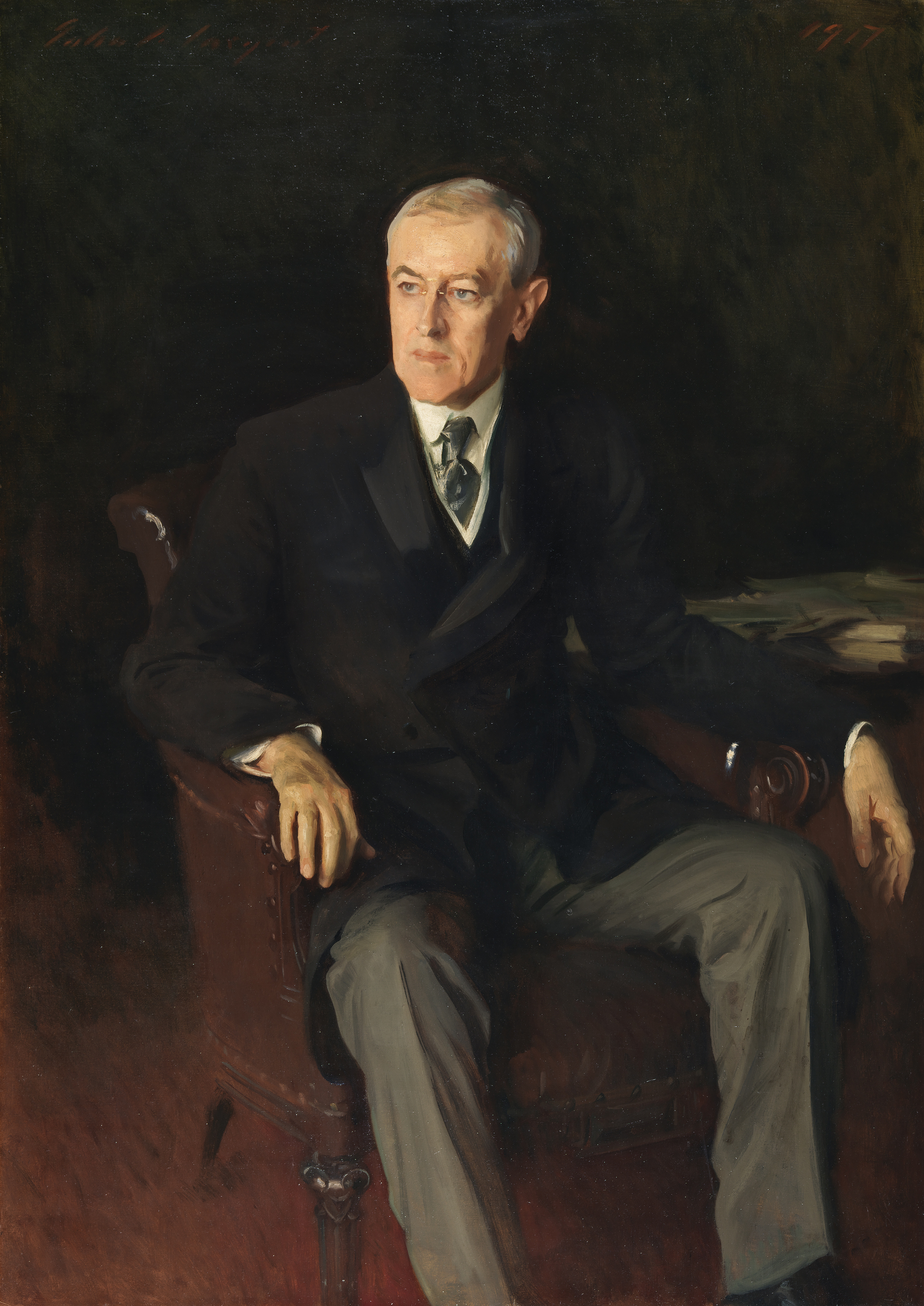
- Artist: John Singer Sargent
- Year: 1917
- Type: Oil on canvas, portrait painting
- Dimensions: 153 cm × 109 cm (60 in × 43 in)
- Location: National Gallery of Ireland, Dublin

Portrait of Woodrow Wilson is a 1917 portrait painting by the Anglo-American artist John Singer Sargent depicting the President of the United States Woodrow Wilson. The same year Wilson oversaw America's entry into the First World War After the Allied victory in 1918 he was one of the key negotiators of the Treaty of Versailles, but failed to get the terms for the new League of Nations ratified by his own Congress.

The Italian-born Sargent had been trained in Paris but spent most of his career in Britain where he had become the most celebrated portraitist of the late Victorian era. Although he had largely given up his lucrative portrait practice he still continued to produce occasional notable portraits. For this work he travelled to the White House in Washington where Wilson sat for him. The painting was displayed at the Royal Academy Exhibition of 1919 held at Burlington House in London. It was commissioned by the directors of National Gallery of Ireland in Dublin in memory of Hugh Lane who had been a major benefactor of Anglo-Irish art and was killed when the Lusitania was torpedoed by a German U-boat in 1915.

== See also ==
- List of works by John Singer Sargent

== Bibliography ==
- Fisher, Paul. The Grand Affair: John Singer Sargent in His World. Picador, 2023.
- Madsen, Annelise K. (ed.) John Singer Sargent & Chicago's Gilded Age. Art Institute of Chicago, 2018.
- Stockwell, Mary. Woodrow Wilson: The Last Romantic. Nova Science Publishers, Incorporated, 2010.
