= Fitting Out, Mousehole Harbour =

Painting by Stanhope Forbes

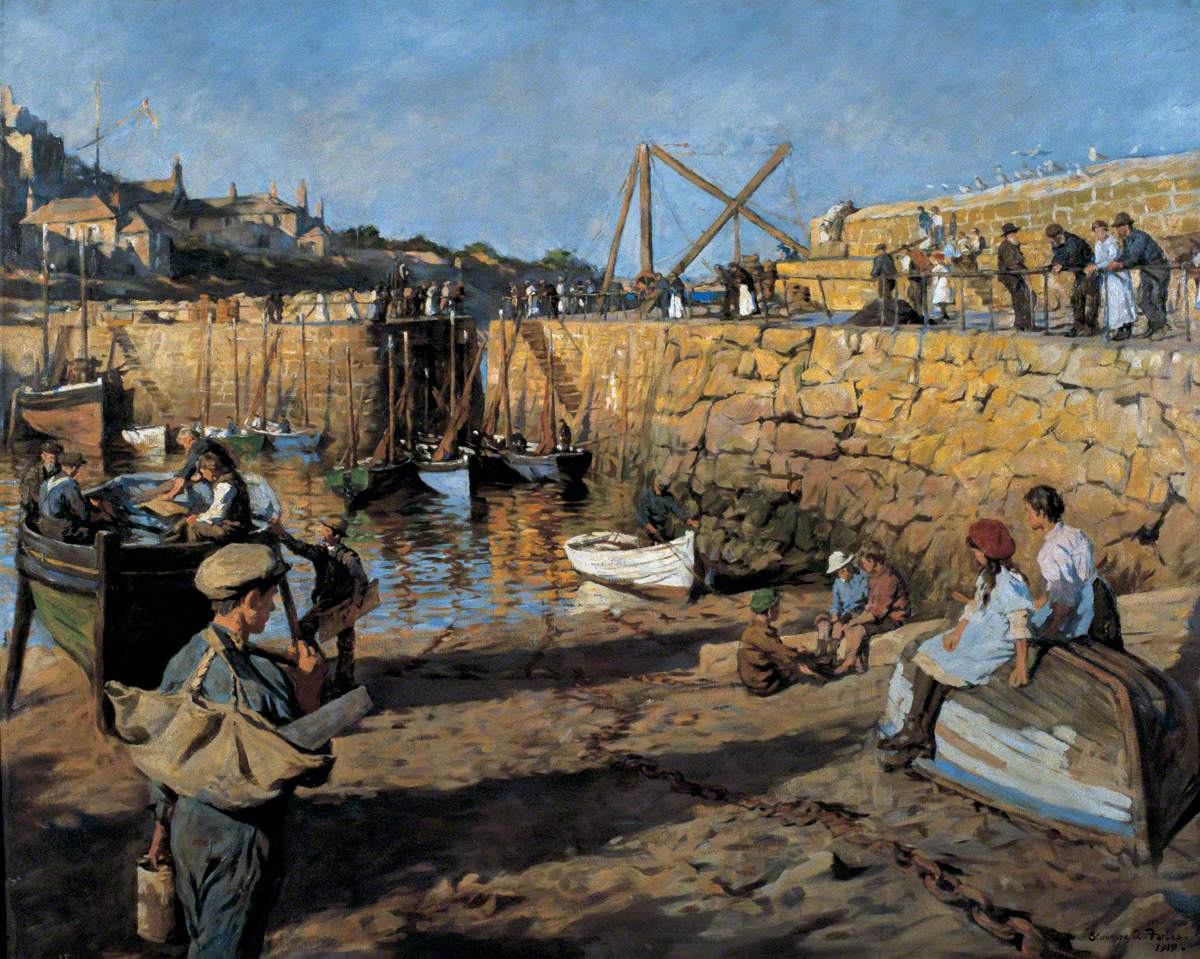
- Artist: Stanhope Forbes
- Year: 1919
- Type: Oil on canvas, genre painting
- Dimensions: 102 cm × 129 cm (40 in × 51 in)
- Location: Cartwright Hall, Bradford

Fitting Out, Mousehole Harbour is a 1919 oil painting by the Irish-born artist Stanhope Forbes. It depicts a scene in the Cornish coastal village of Mousehole. Forbes was a prominent member of the Newlyn School of artists who focused on depictions of everyday life.

The painting was the main work he displayed at the Royal Academy Exhibition of 1919 held at Burlington House in London. It is now in the collection of Cartwright Hall in Bradford, having been acquired in 1923.

== Bibliography ==
- Cullen, Fintan & Barber, Fionna (ed.) The Routledge Companion to Irish Art. Taylor & Francis, 2025.
- Fox, Caroline & Greenacre, Francis. Painting in Newlyn, 1880-1930. Barbican Art Gallery, 1985.
- Roe, Sonia. Oil Paintings in Public Ownership in West Yorkshire. Public Catalogue Foundation, 2007.
