= Royal Academy Exhibition of 1919 =

1919 art exhibition in London

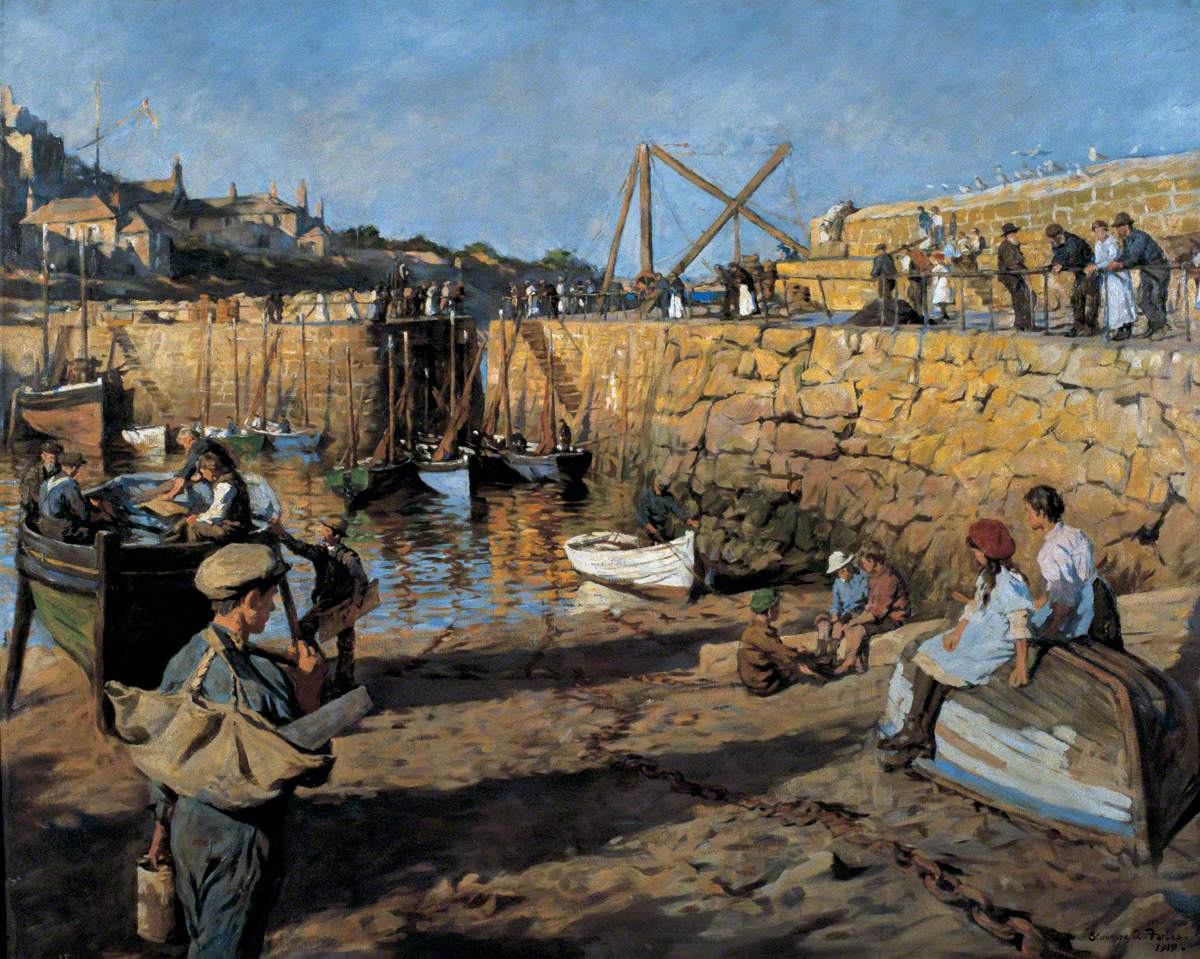
Fitting Out, Mousehole Harbour by Stanhope Forbes

The Royal Academy Exhibition of 1919 was the hundred and fifty first annual Summer Exhibition of the British Royal Academy of Arts which was held at Burlington House in London's Piccadilly from 5 May to 9 August 1919. It was the first to held following the end of fighting in the First World War the previous November, although the formal peace talks continued Paris Peace Conference. It attracted more than 200,000 visitors.

One of the largest and most celebrated works on display was Gassed, a very large painting by the Anglo-American artist John Singer Sargent which showed the aftermath of a mustard gas attack on the Western Front. The work was commissioned by the British War Memorials Committee and now hangs in the Imperial War Museum. Singer Sargent also displayed another work showing Arras Cathedral which had suffered heavily in the fighting. His more typical portraits included one of Woodrow Wilson, the President of the United States. Alfred Munnings who produced a large number of war paintings, returned to landscape paintings and other peaceful scenes. His submissions included Zennor Hill, Cornwall. John Lavery displayed a painting of the ballroom at Londonderry House which had been converted into a wartime hospital as well as pictures commemorating the surrender of the Imperial German Navy on HMS Queen Elizabeth at Rosyth.

Other works on display were Cocaine by Alfred Priest and Fitting Out, Mousehole Harbour by the Irish artist Stanhope Forbes continued the pre-war tradition of the Newlyn School with a scene on the Cornish Coast. The former President of the Royal Academy Edward Poynter exhibited a portrait of Edward VII he had produced a decade earlier. James Jebusa Shannon likewise displayed a pre-war portrait of the actress Marie Lohr. Frederick William Elwell's picture of the kitchen of The Beverley Arms in Yorkshire was acquired by the Chantrey Bequest. George Fiddes Watt showed a portrait of Arthur Balfour, the former Prime Minister.

== Gallery ==
Gassed by John Singer Sargent

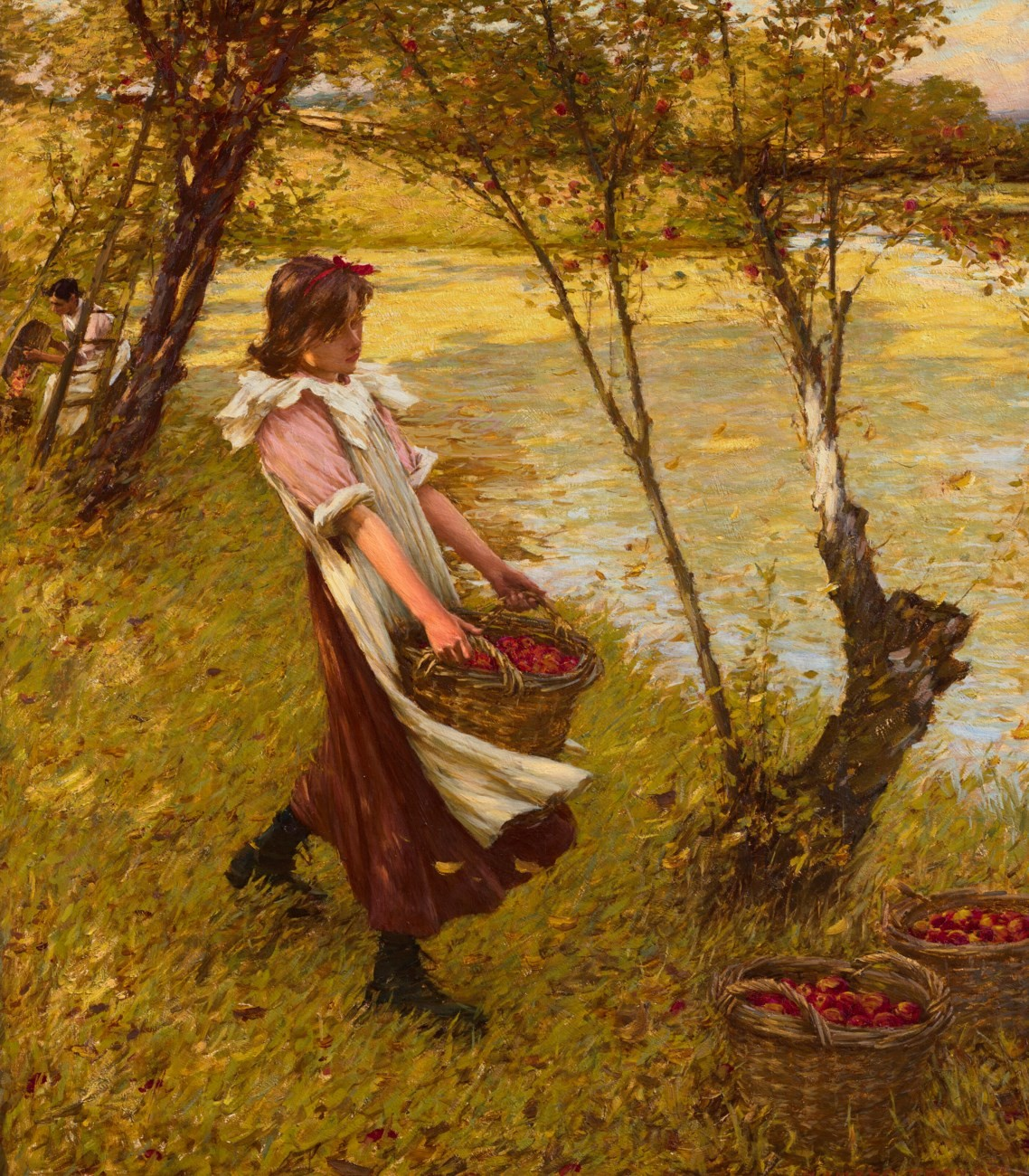
In the Orchard, Haylands, Graffham by Henry Herbert La Thangue

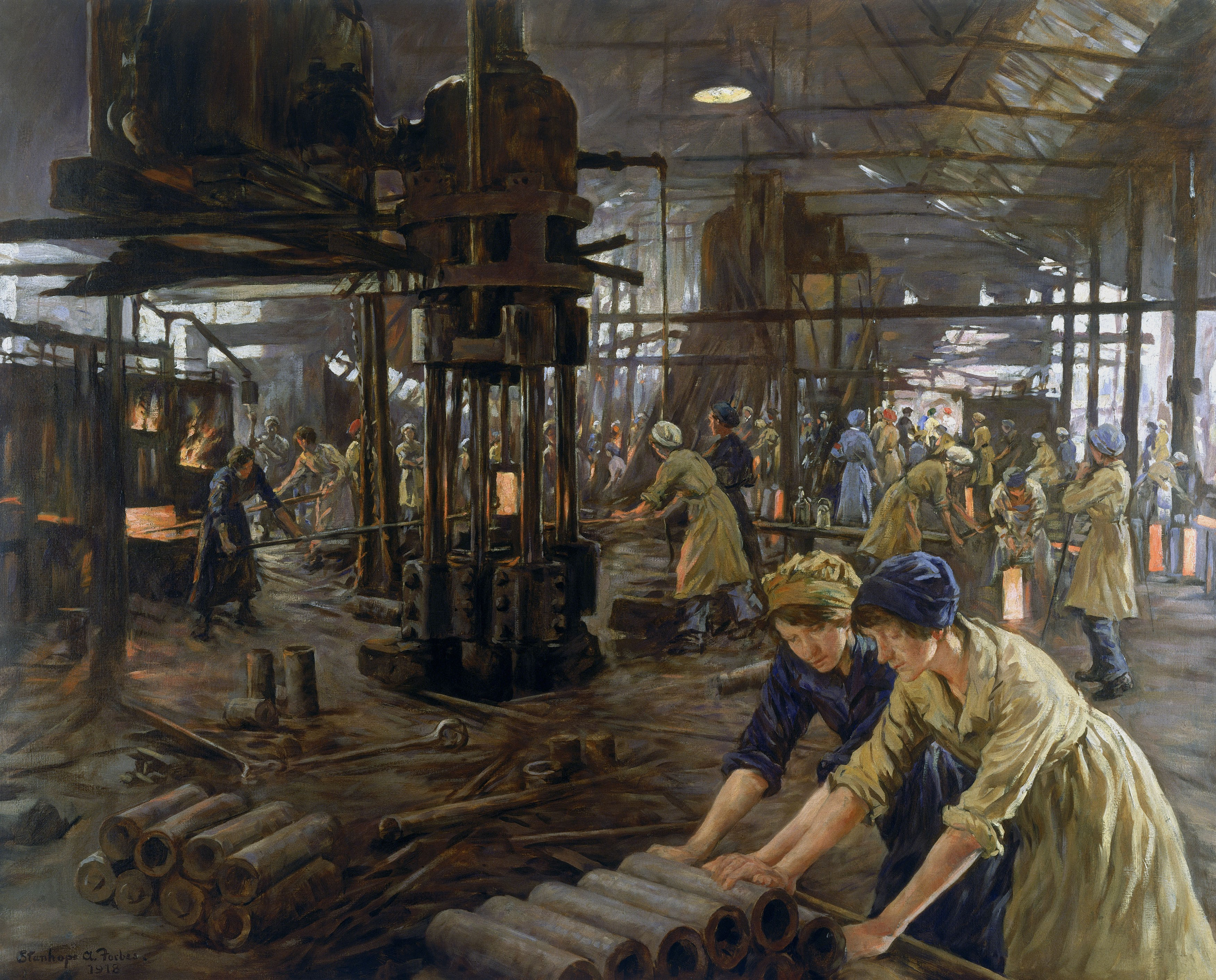
The Munitions Girls by Stanhope Forbes

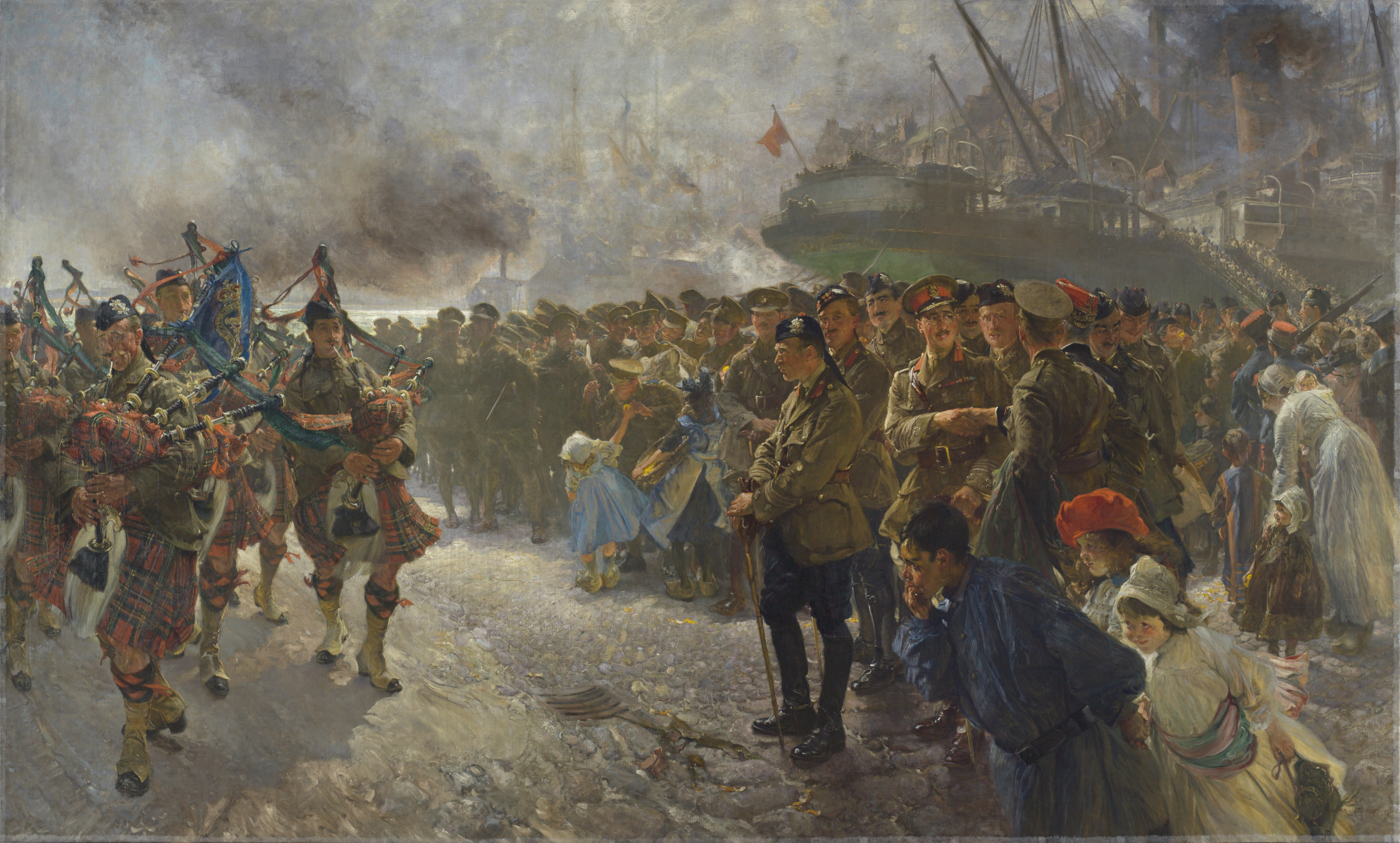
Landing of the First Canadian Division at Saint-Nazaire, 1915 by Edgar Bundy

Dazzled Leave Ships, Boulogne by Charles Bryant

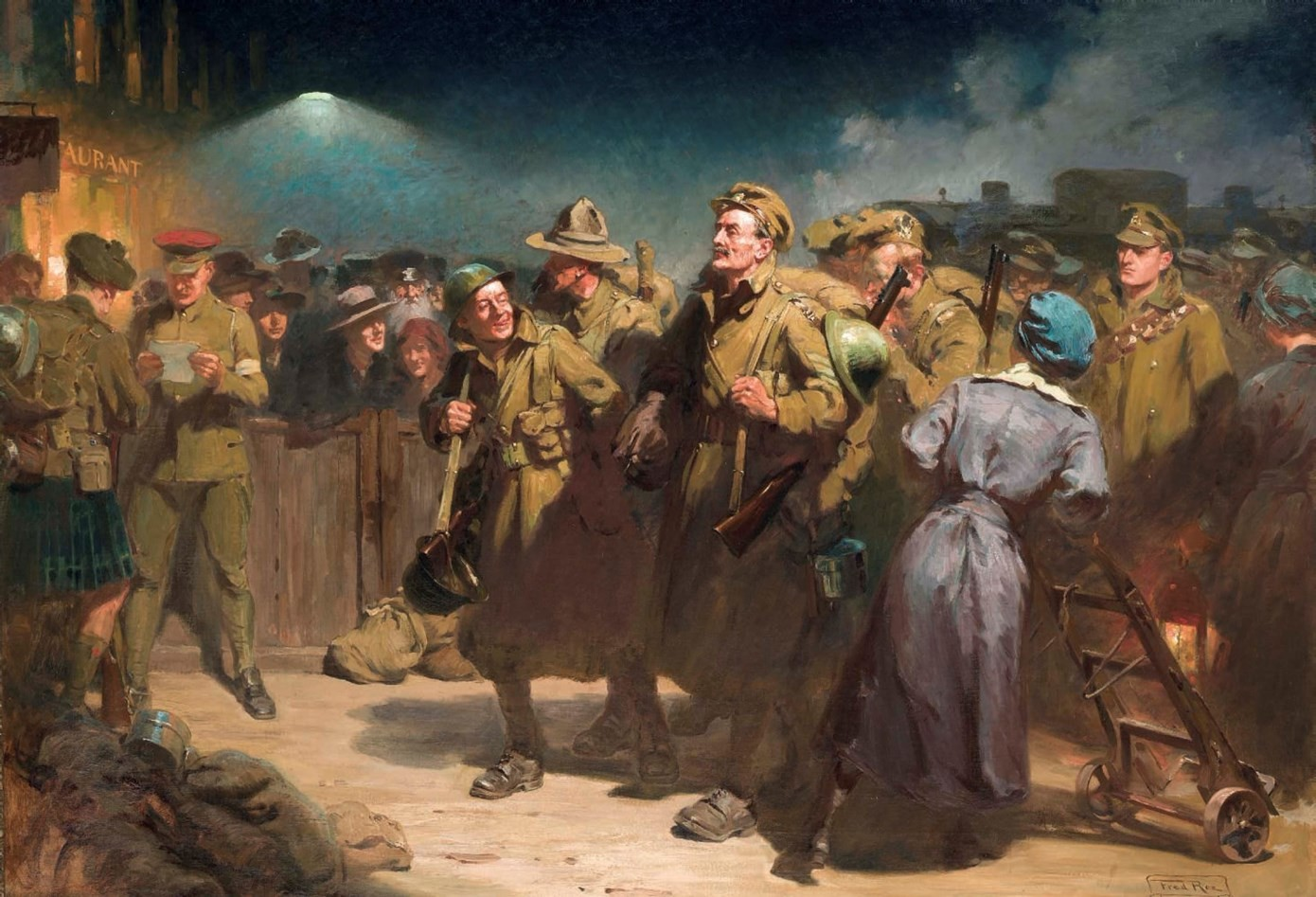
The Return of the Victors, Waterloo Station by Fred Roe

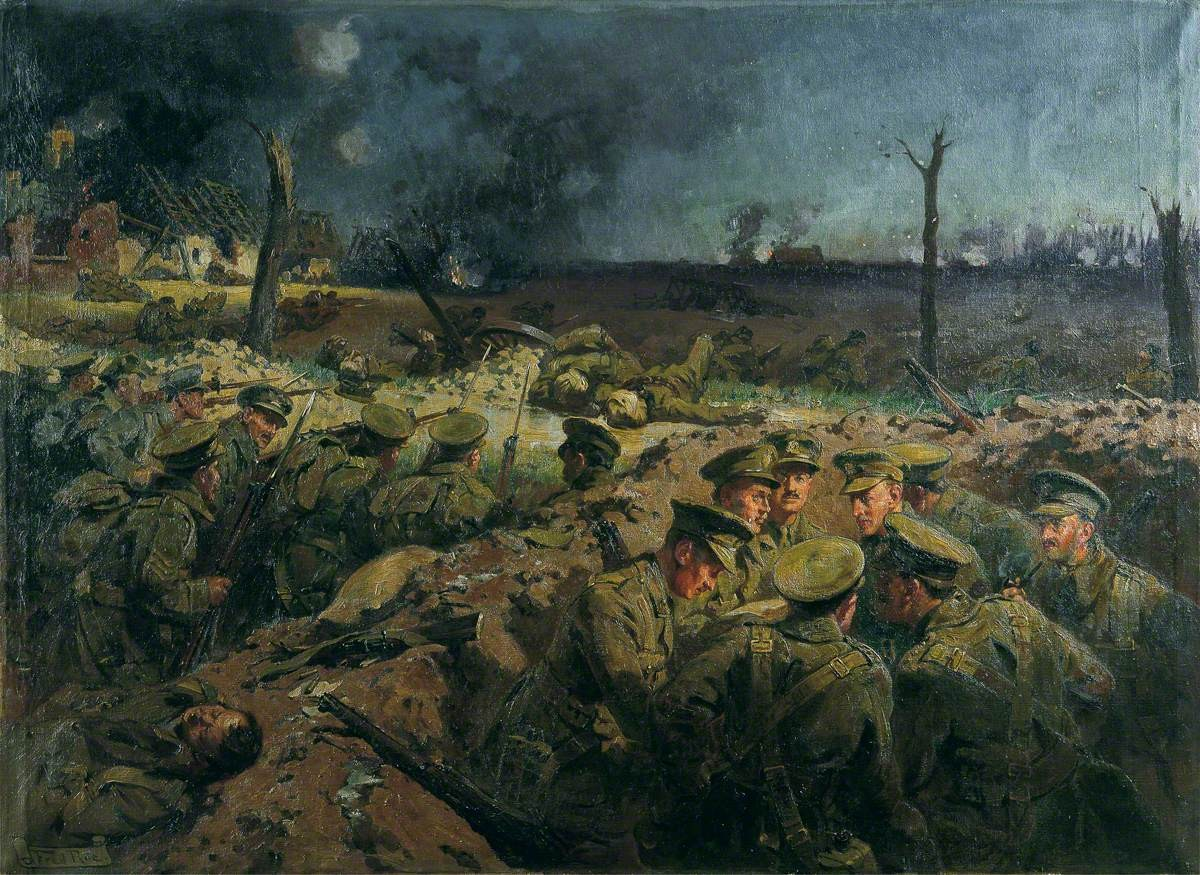
4th Suffolks at Neuve Chapelle by Fred Roe

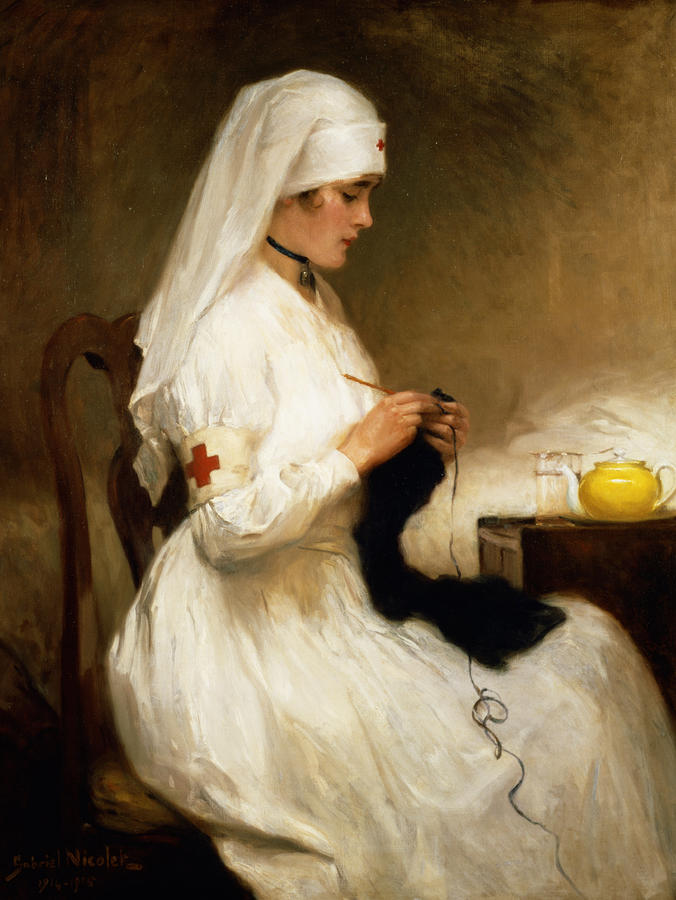
The Good Samaritan by Gabriel Nicolet

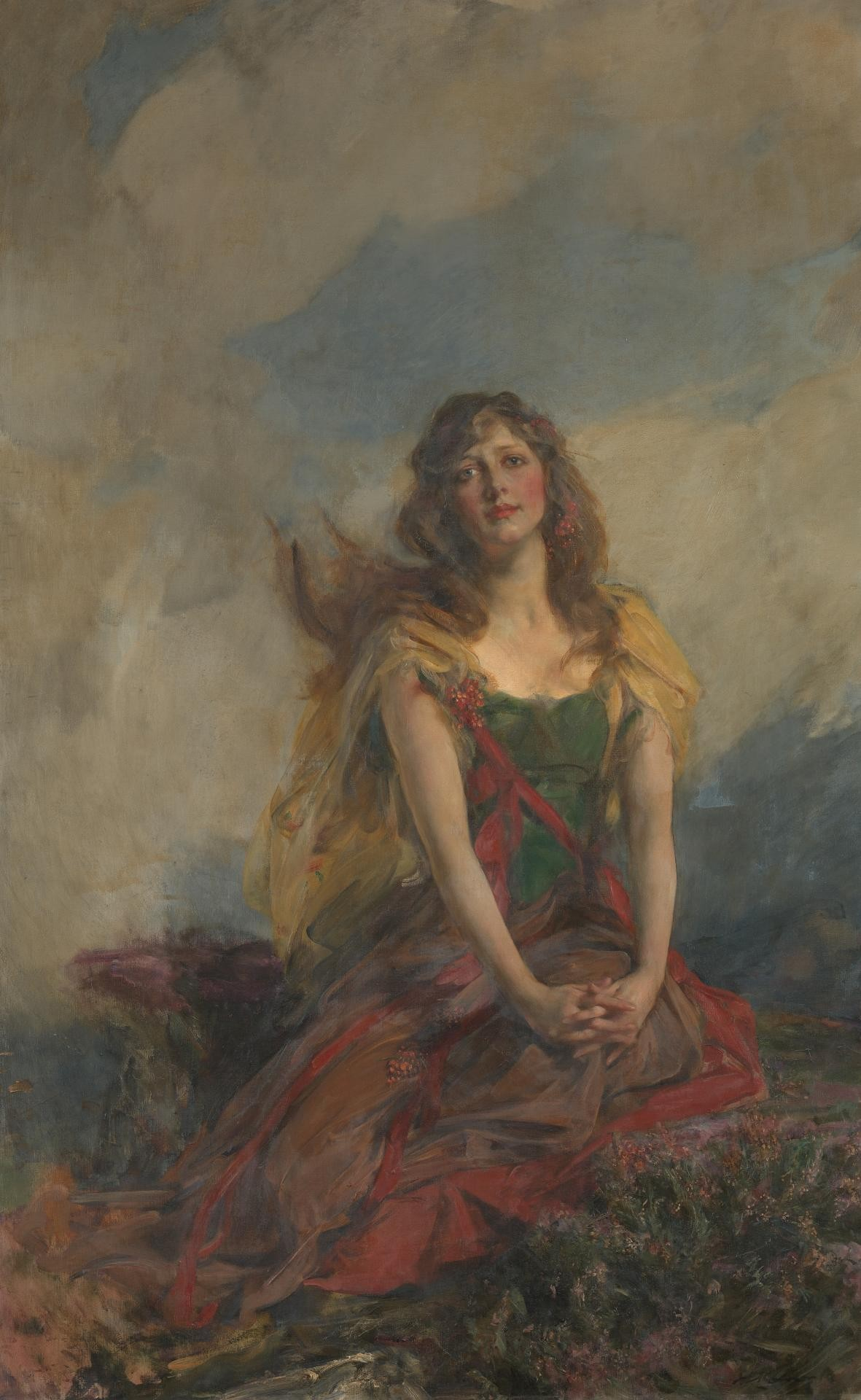
Marie Lohr as Lady Babbie by James Jebusa Shannon

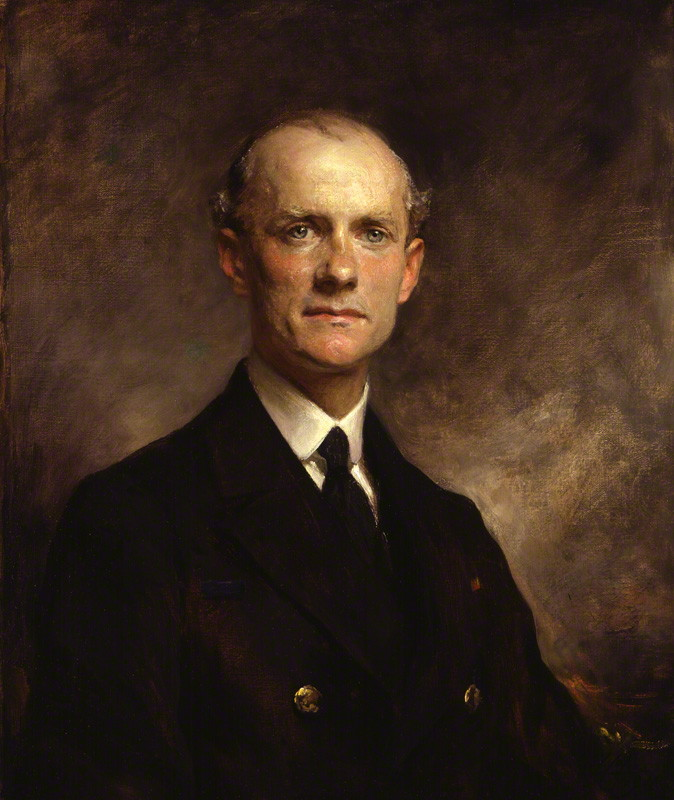
Portrait of Alfred Carpenter by Arthur Stockdale Cope

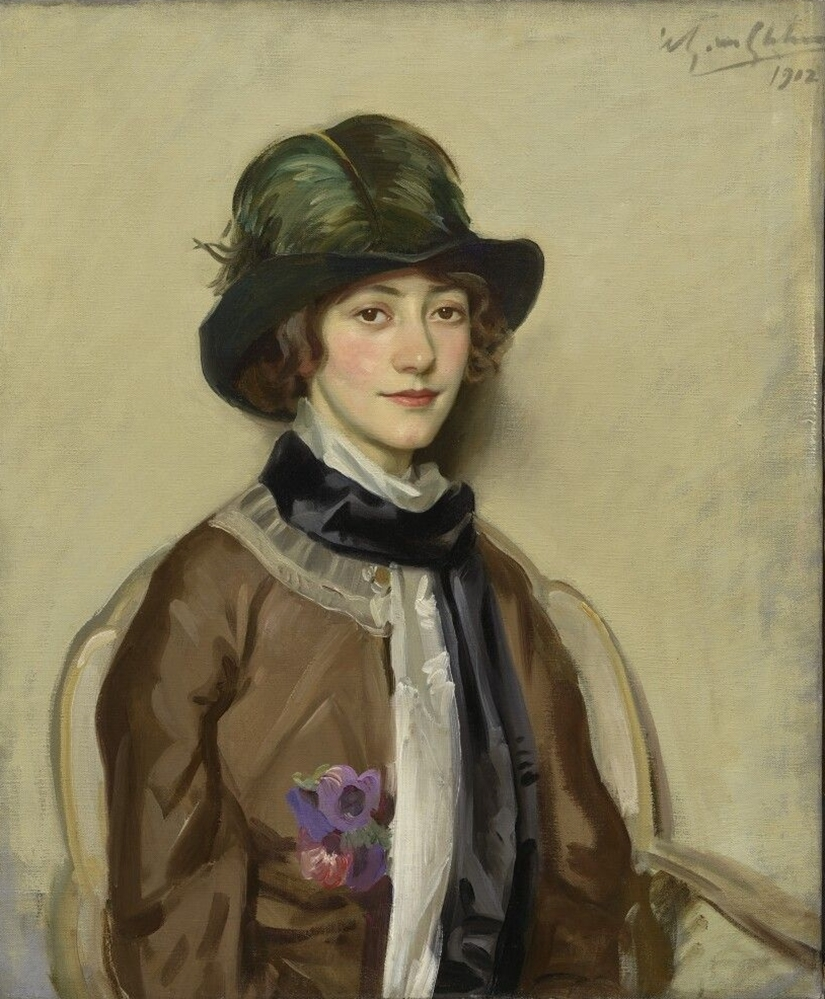
Portrait of Lynn Fontanne by Wilfrid de Glehn

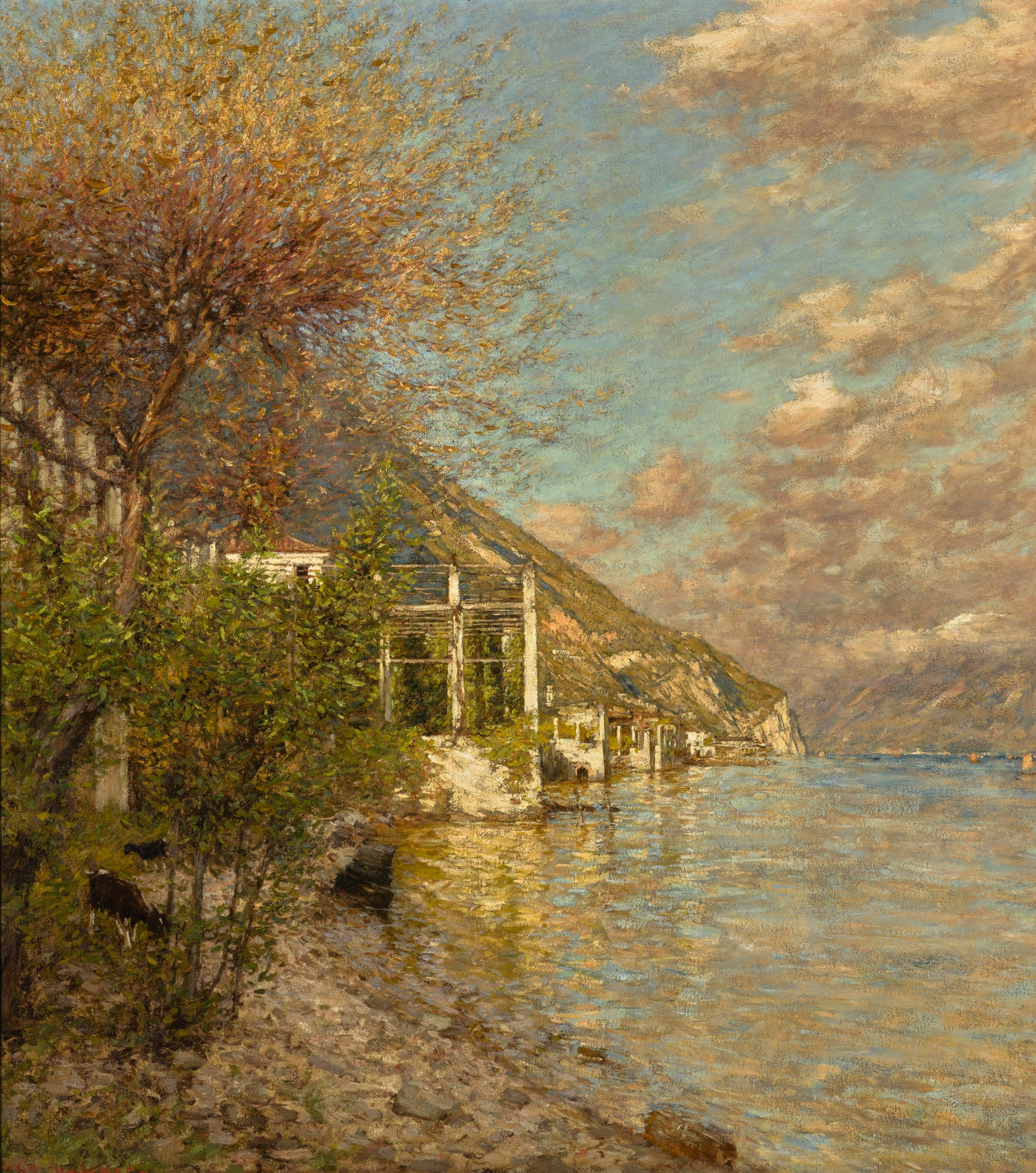
A Brescian Shore by Henry Herbert La Thangue

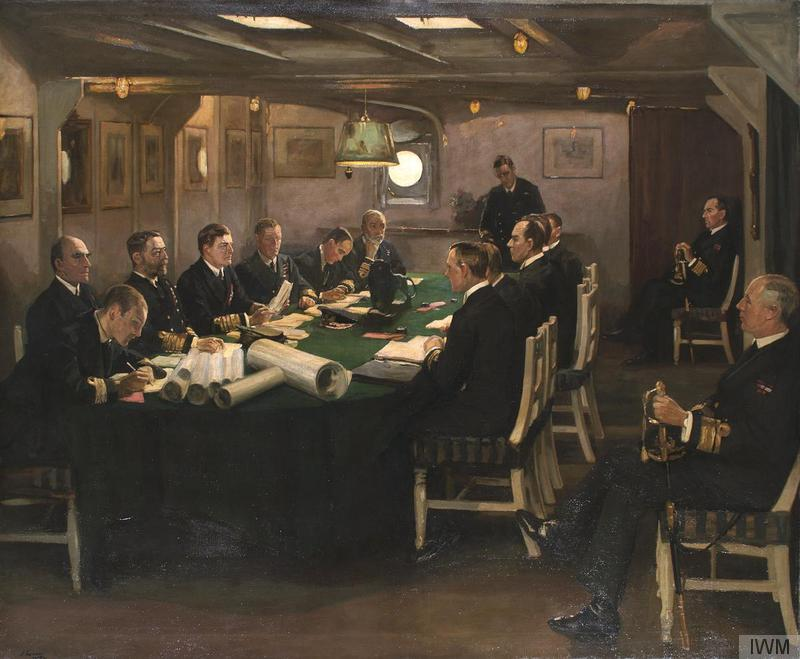
The Surrender of the German Navy, 1918 by John Lavery

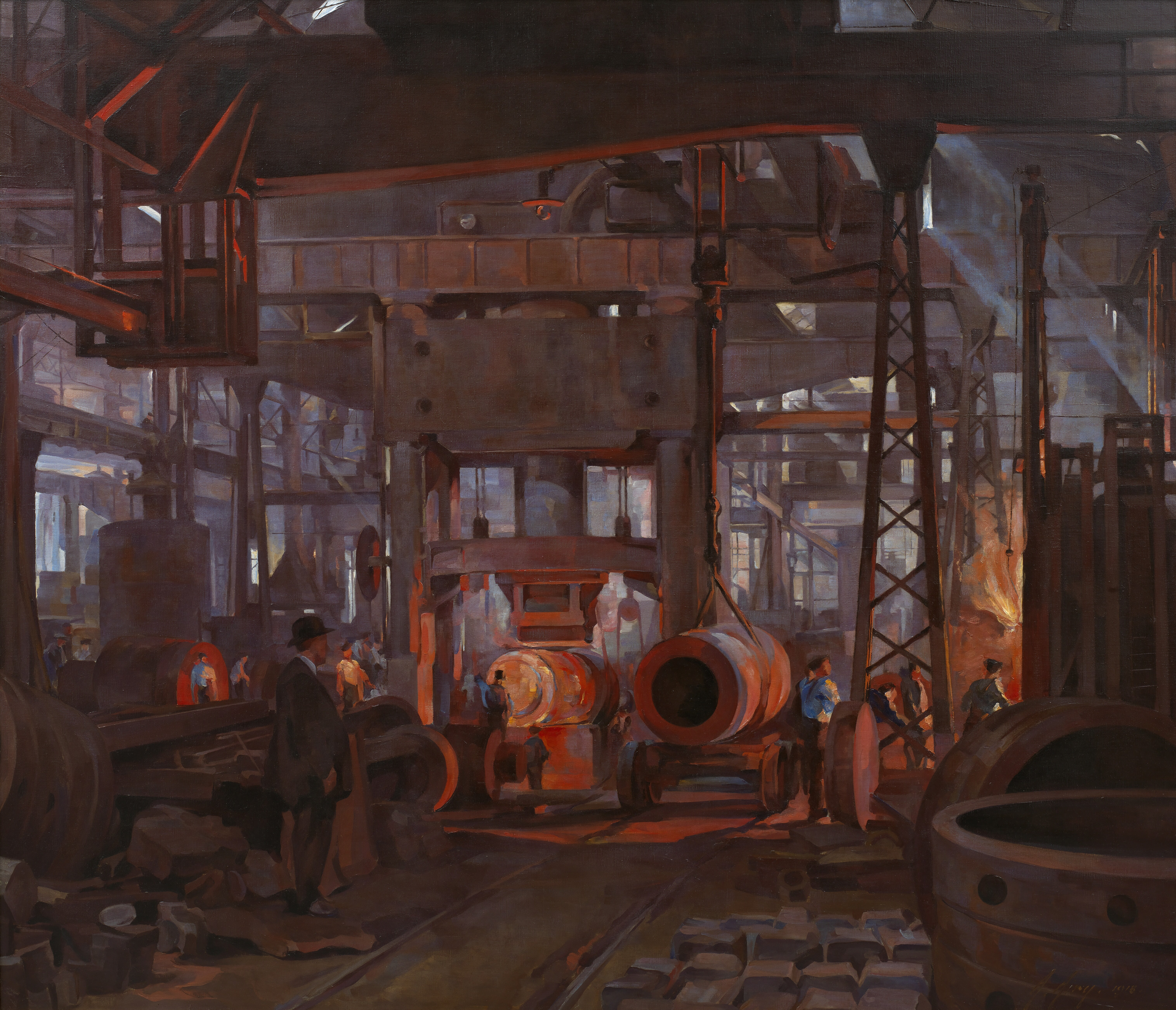
The L Press by Anna Airy

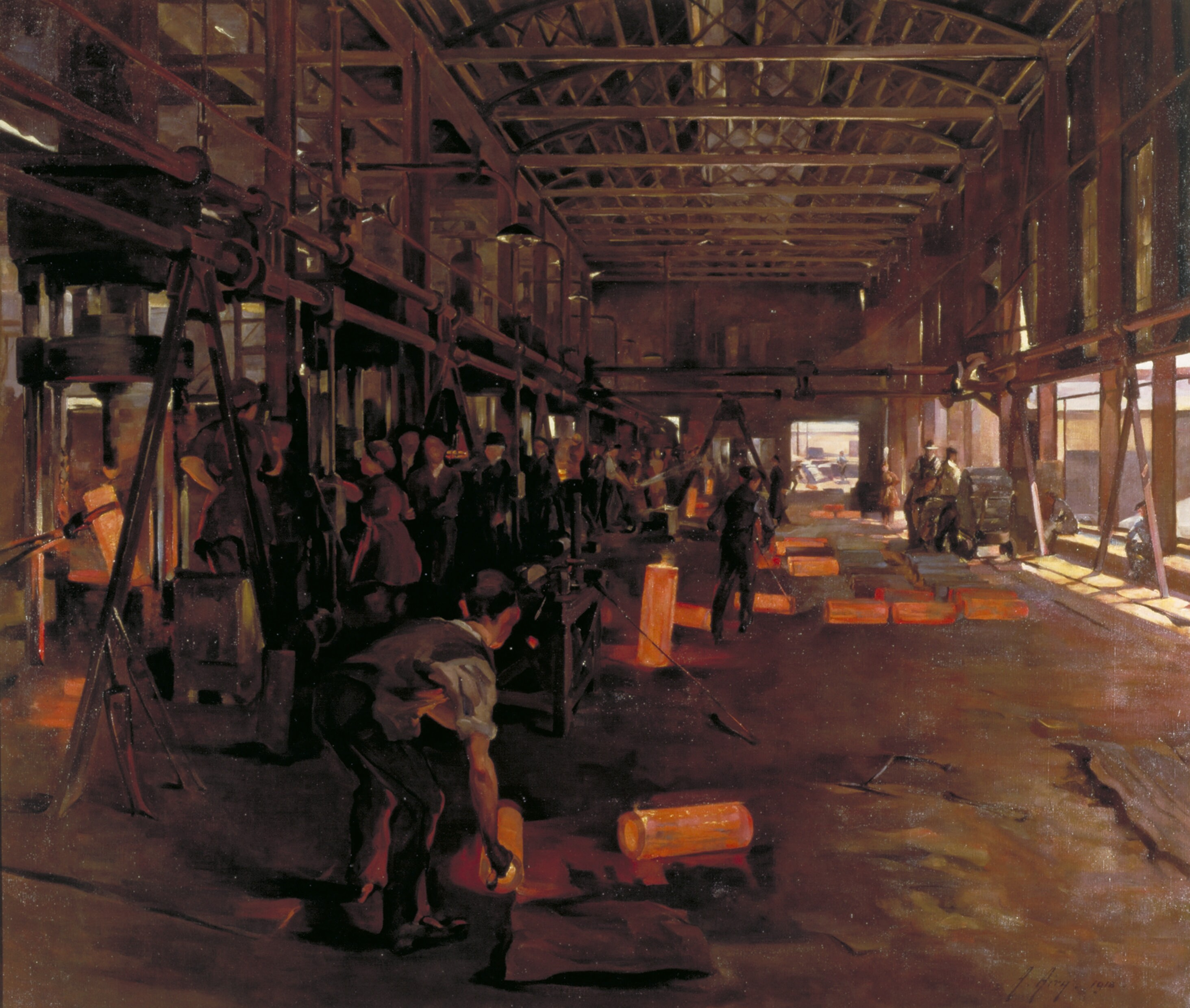
The Shell Forge by Anna Airy

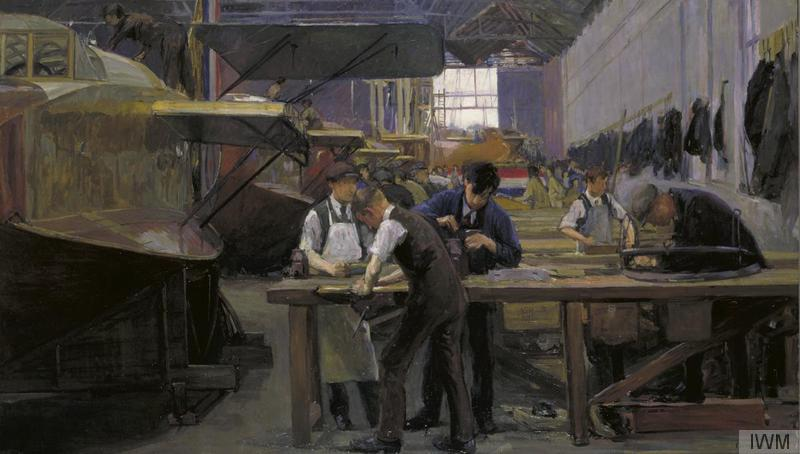
Building Flying Boats by Flora Lion

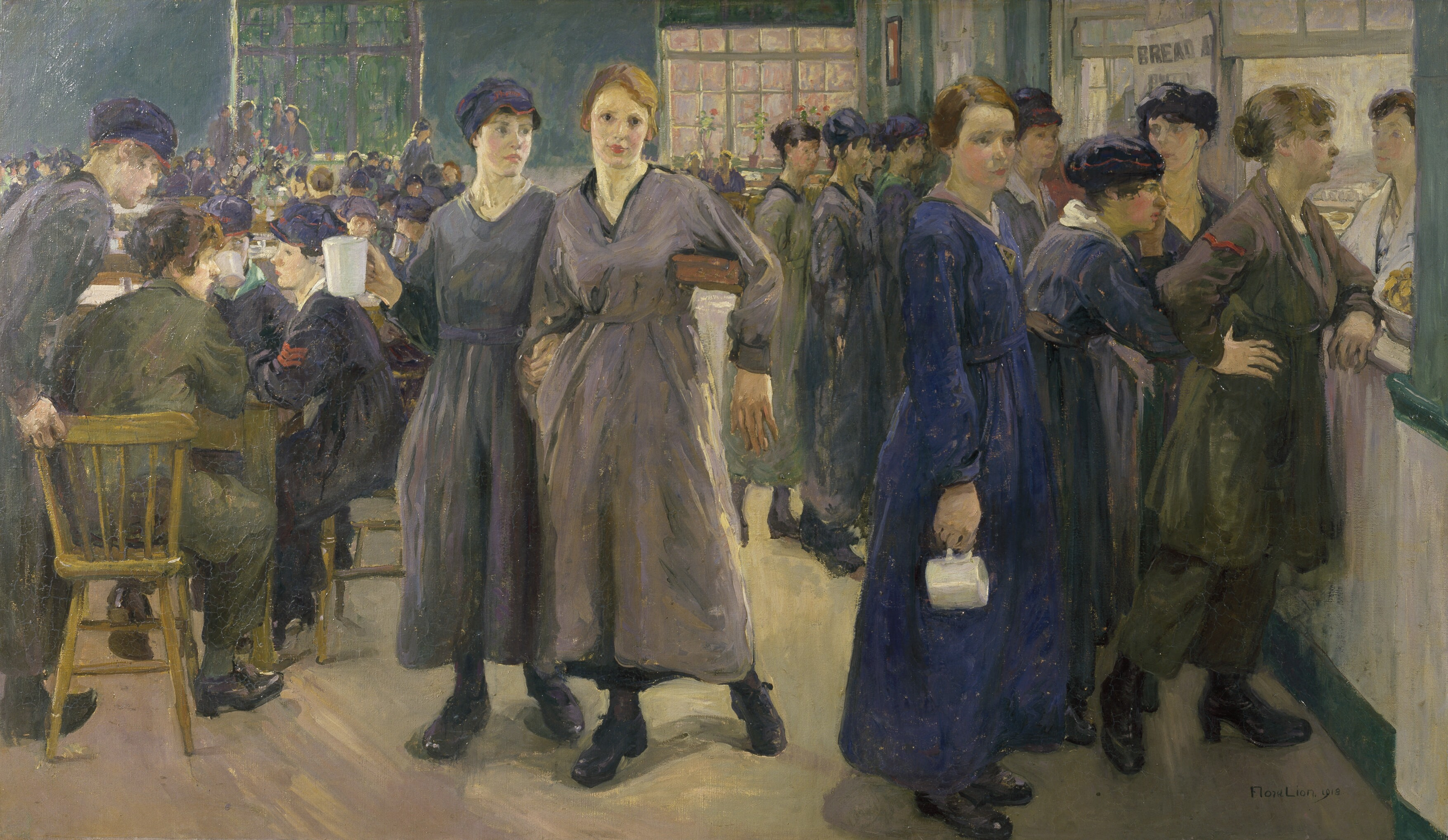
Woman's Canteen at a Munitions Factory by Flora Lion

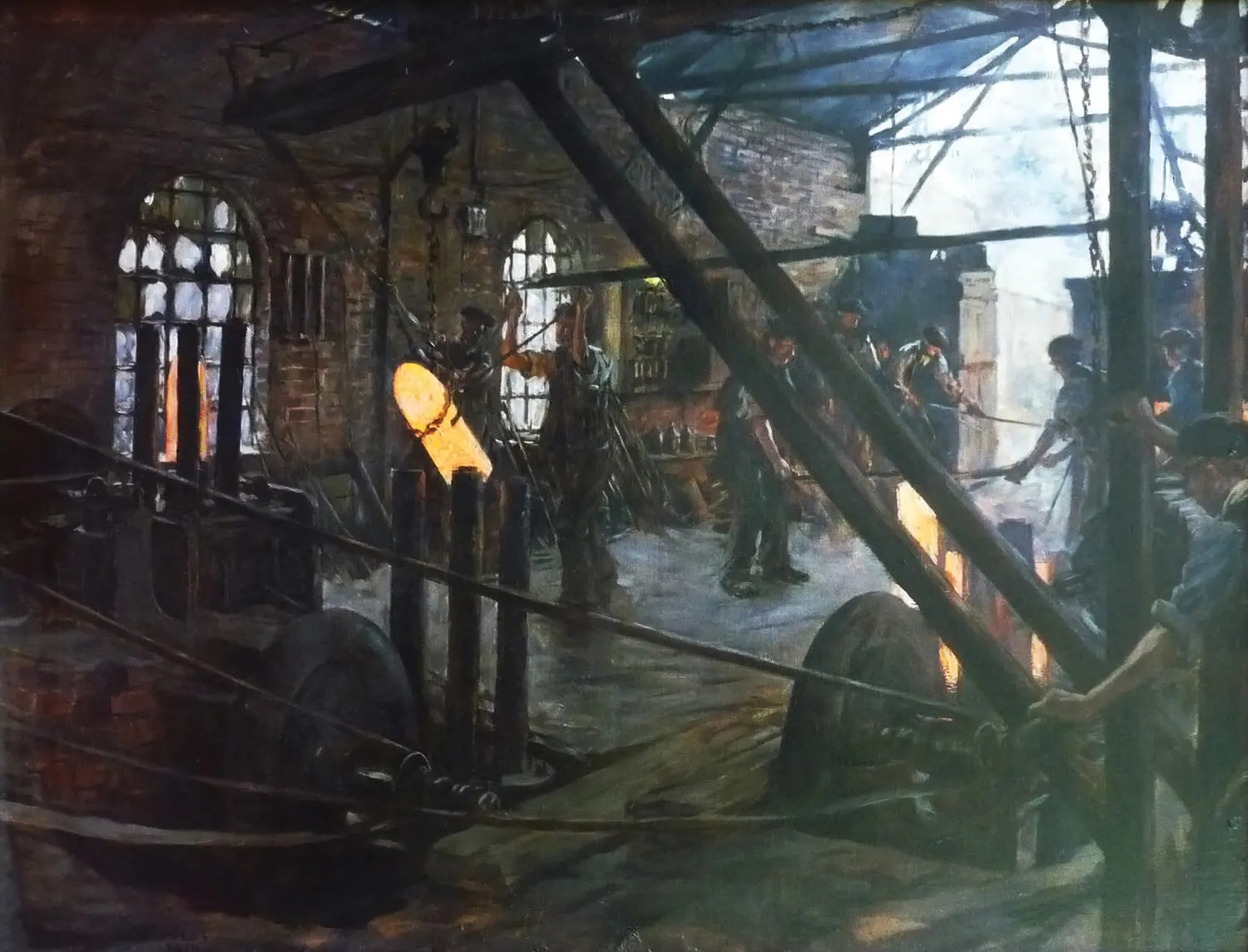
Shell Workers by Stanhope Forbes

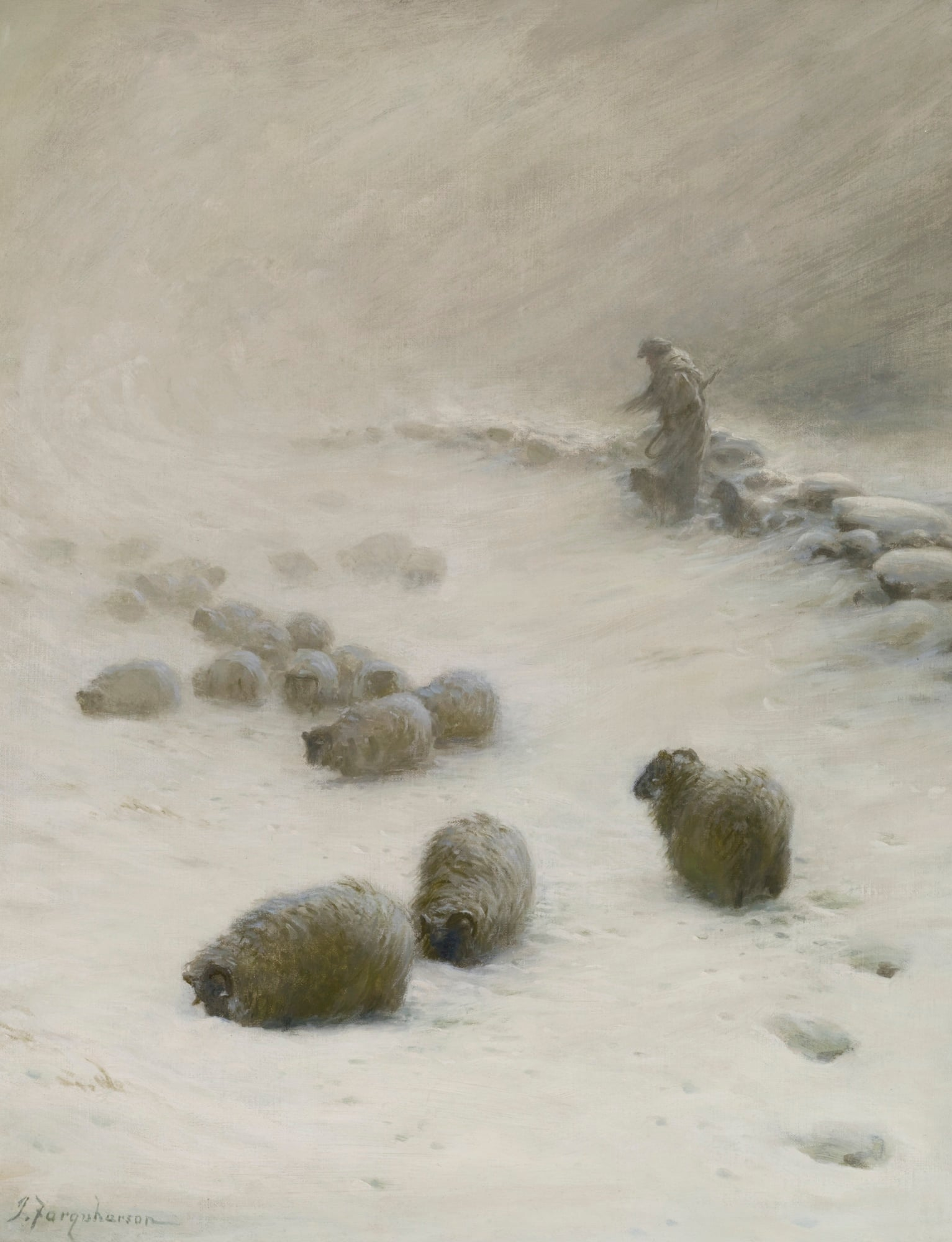
Blow, Blow, Thou Wintry Wind by Joseph Farquharson

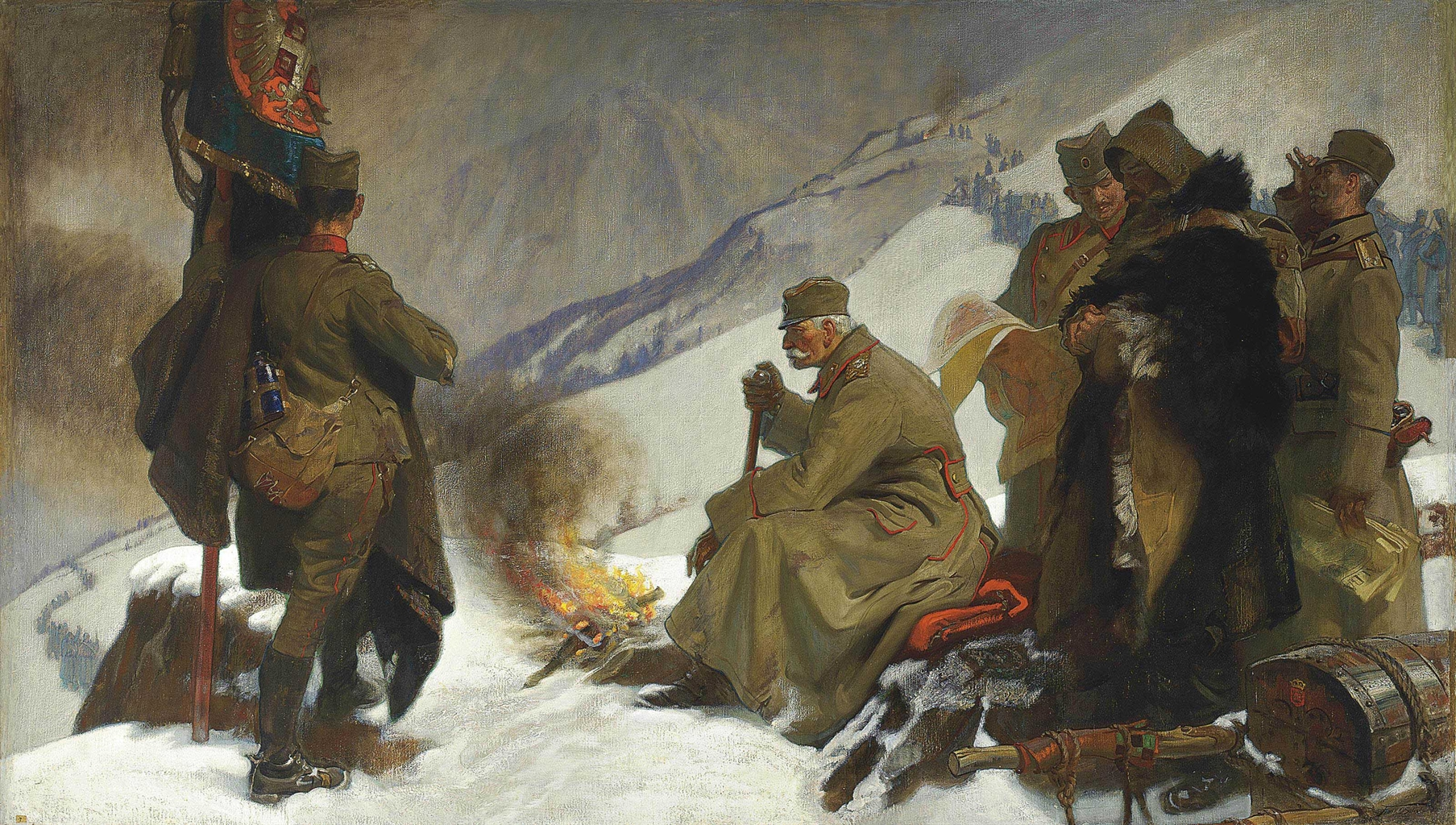
King Peter of Serbia Retreating Across the Albanian Mountains, 1915 by Frank O. Salisbury

The Line of the Plough by John Arnesby Brown

April by John Arnesby Brown

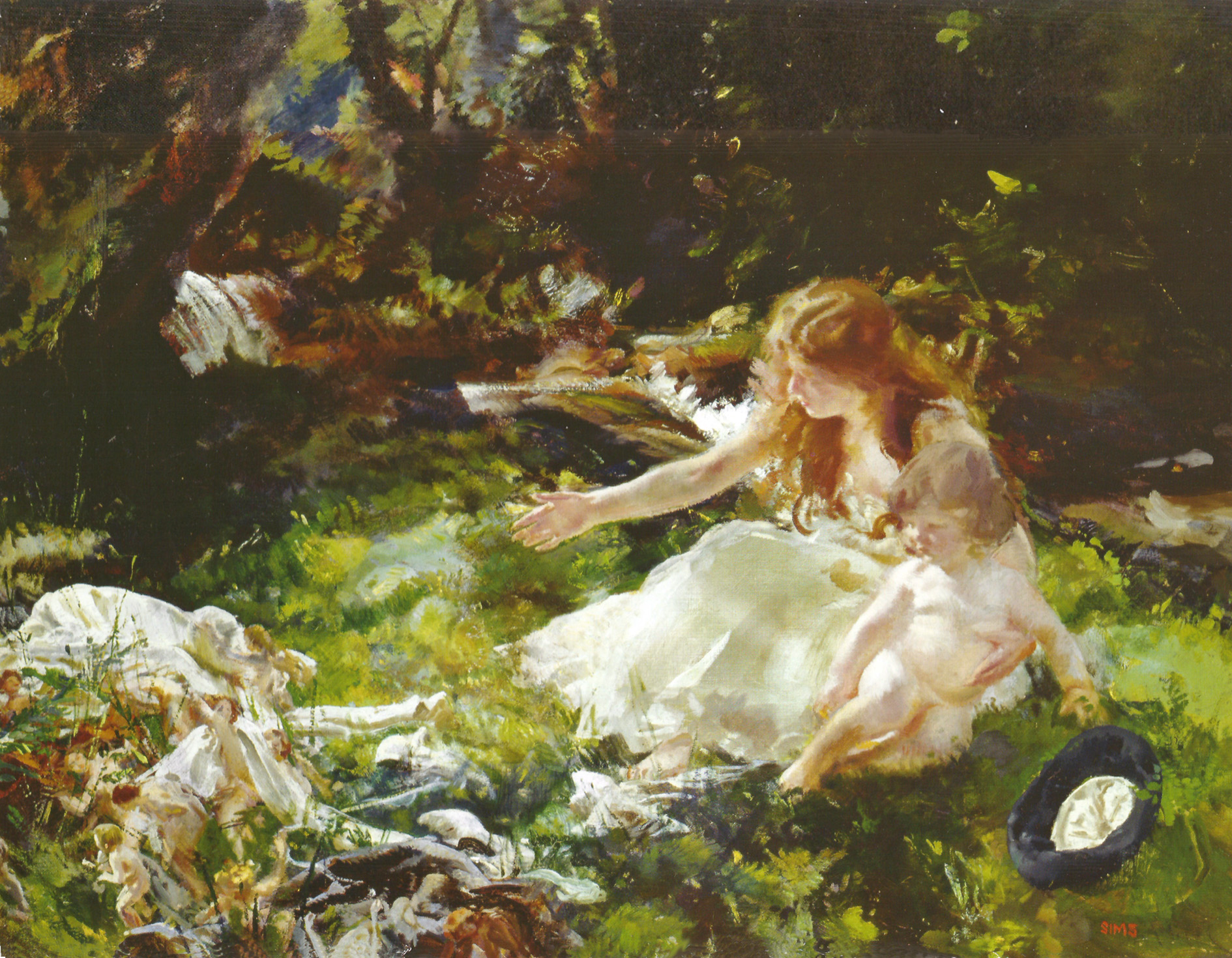
And the Fairies Ran Away With Their Clothes by Charles Sims

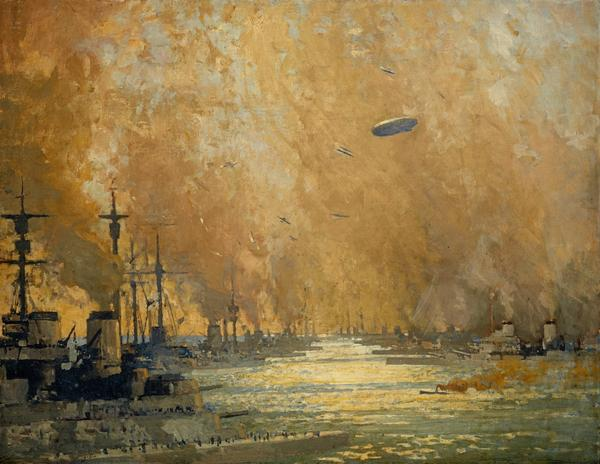
The German Fleet after Surrender by James Paterson

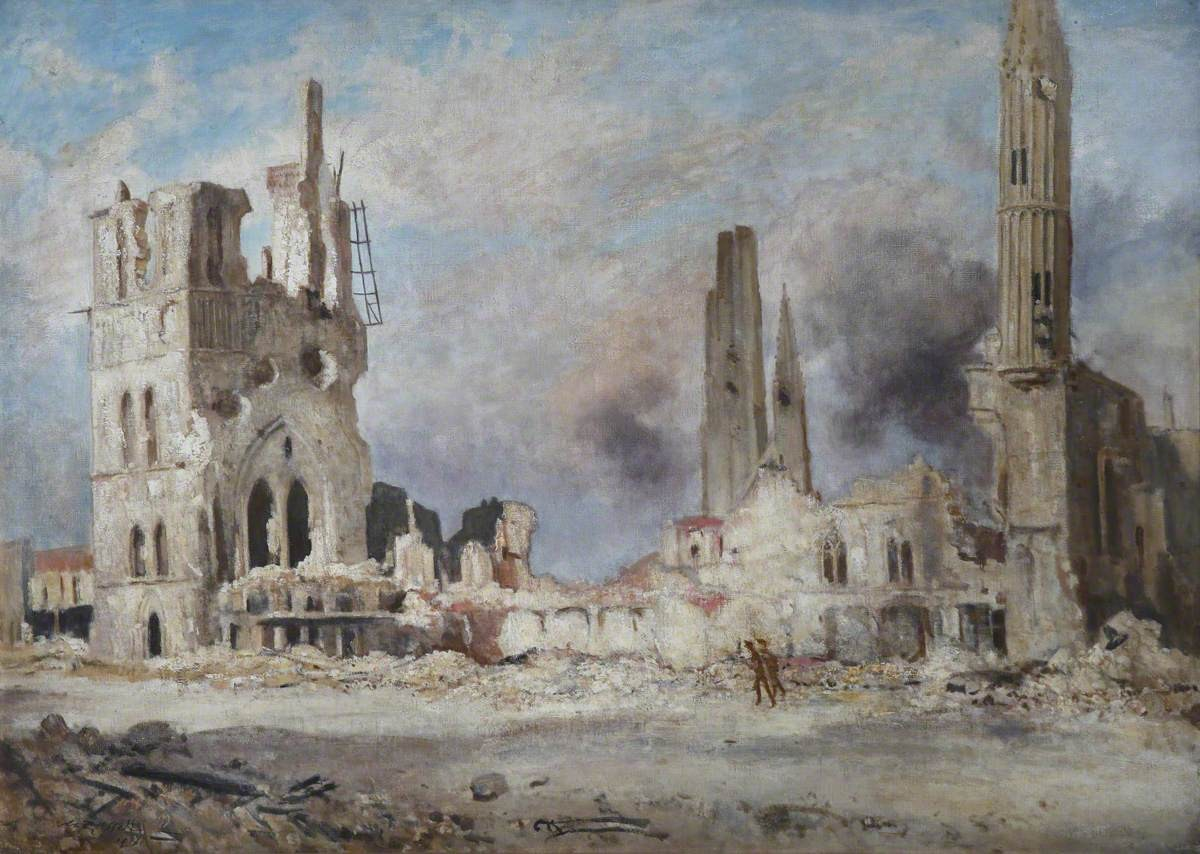
The Cloth Hall, Ypres by Walter Westley Russell

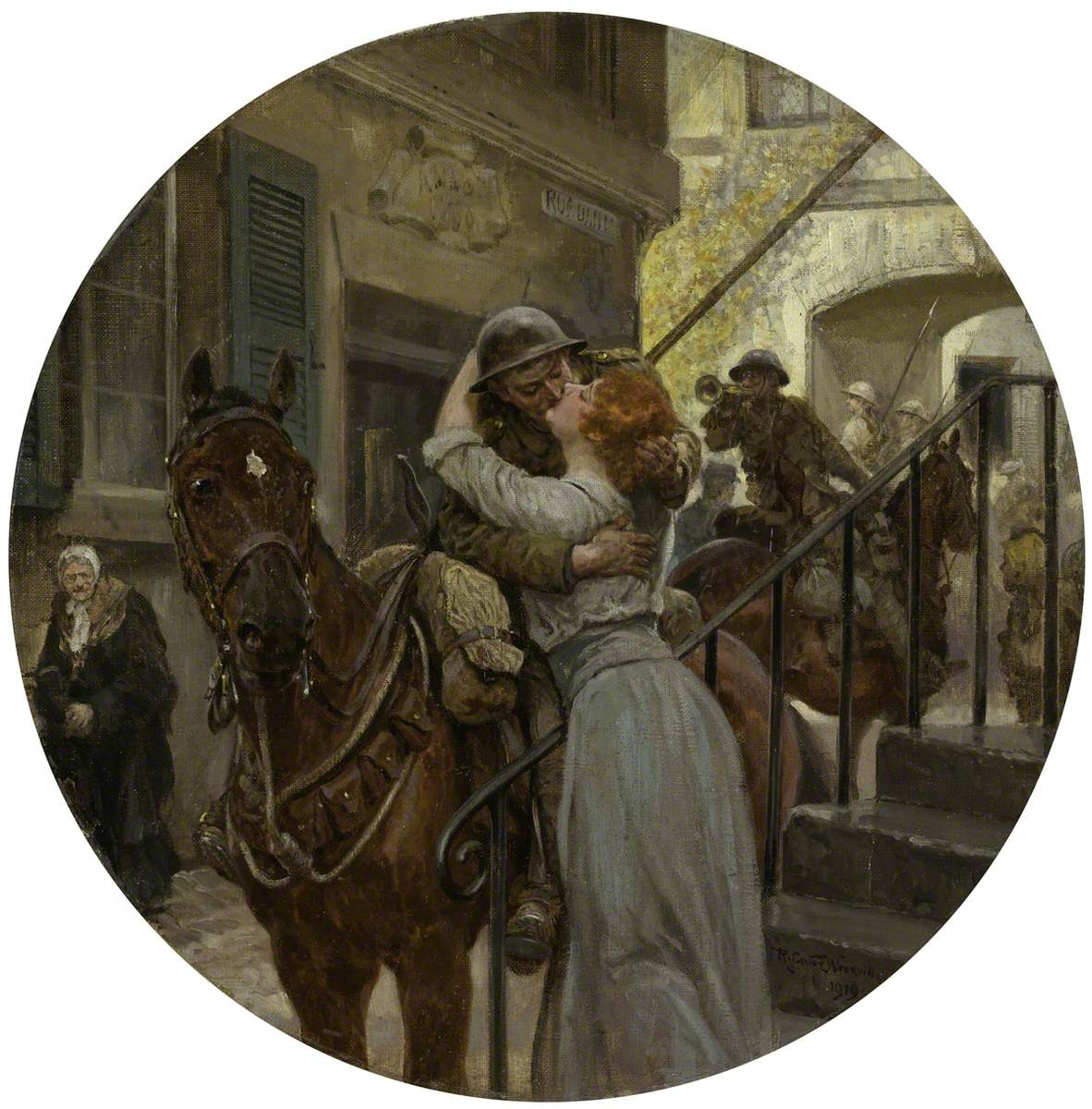
Entry of the 5th Lancers into Mons by Richard Caton Woodville

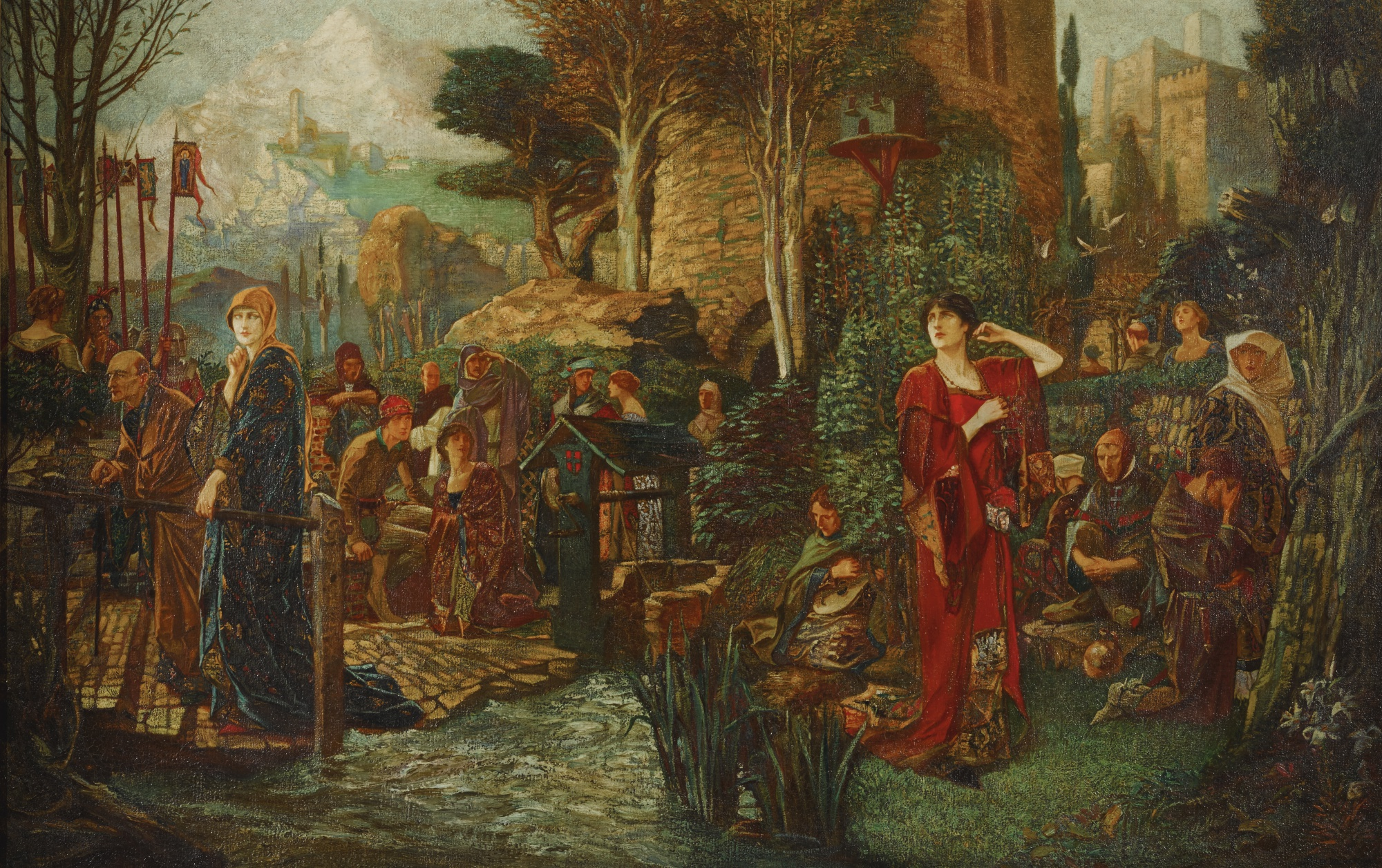
Piccarda by John Riley Wilmer

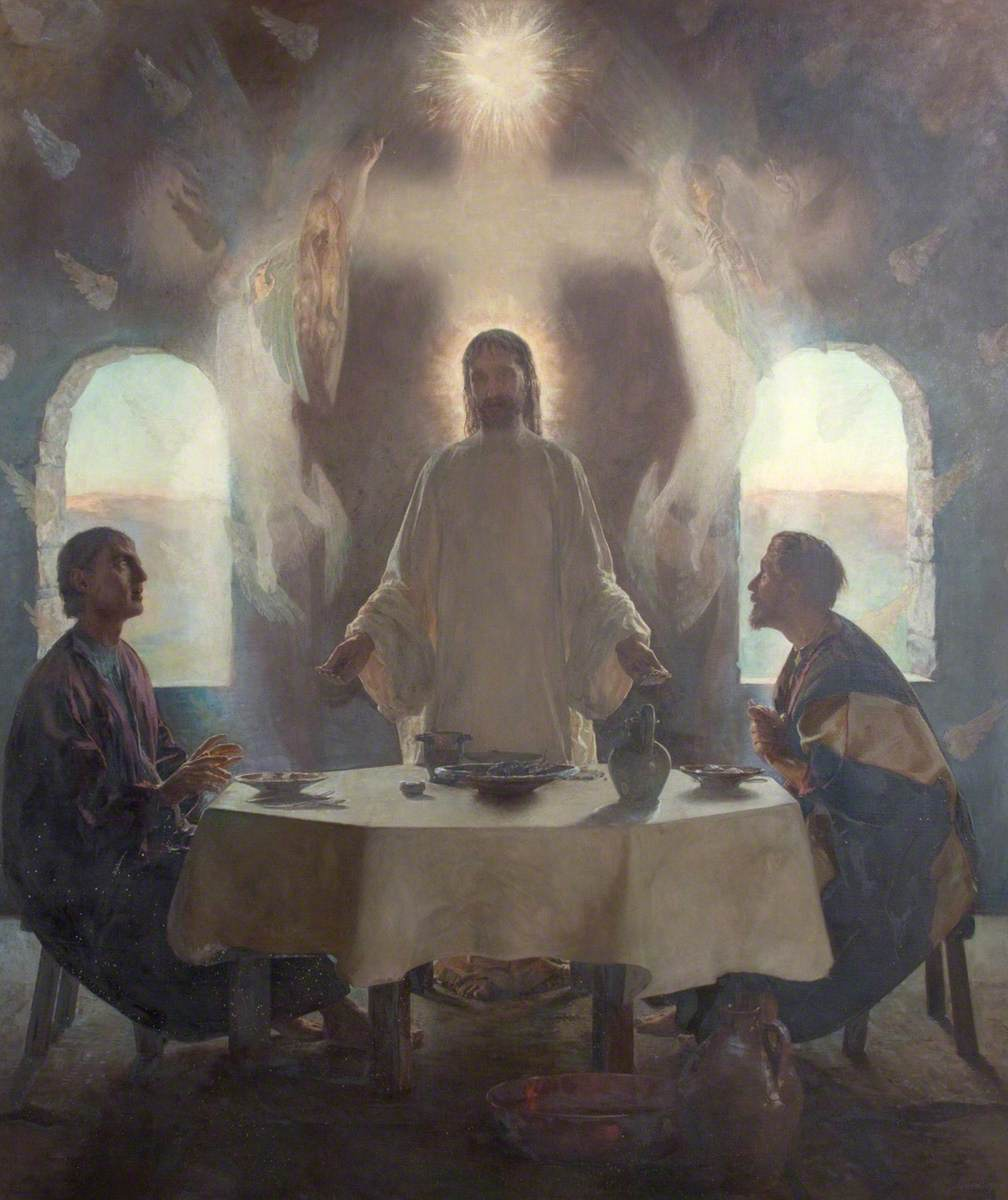
The Supper at Emmaus by Frederick George Swaish

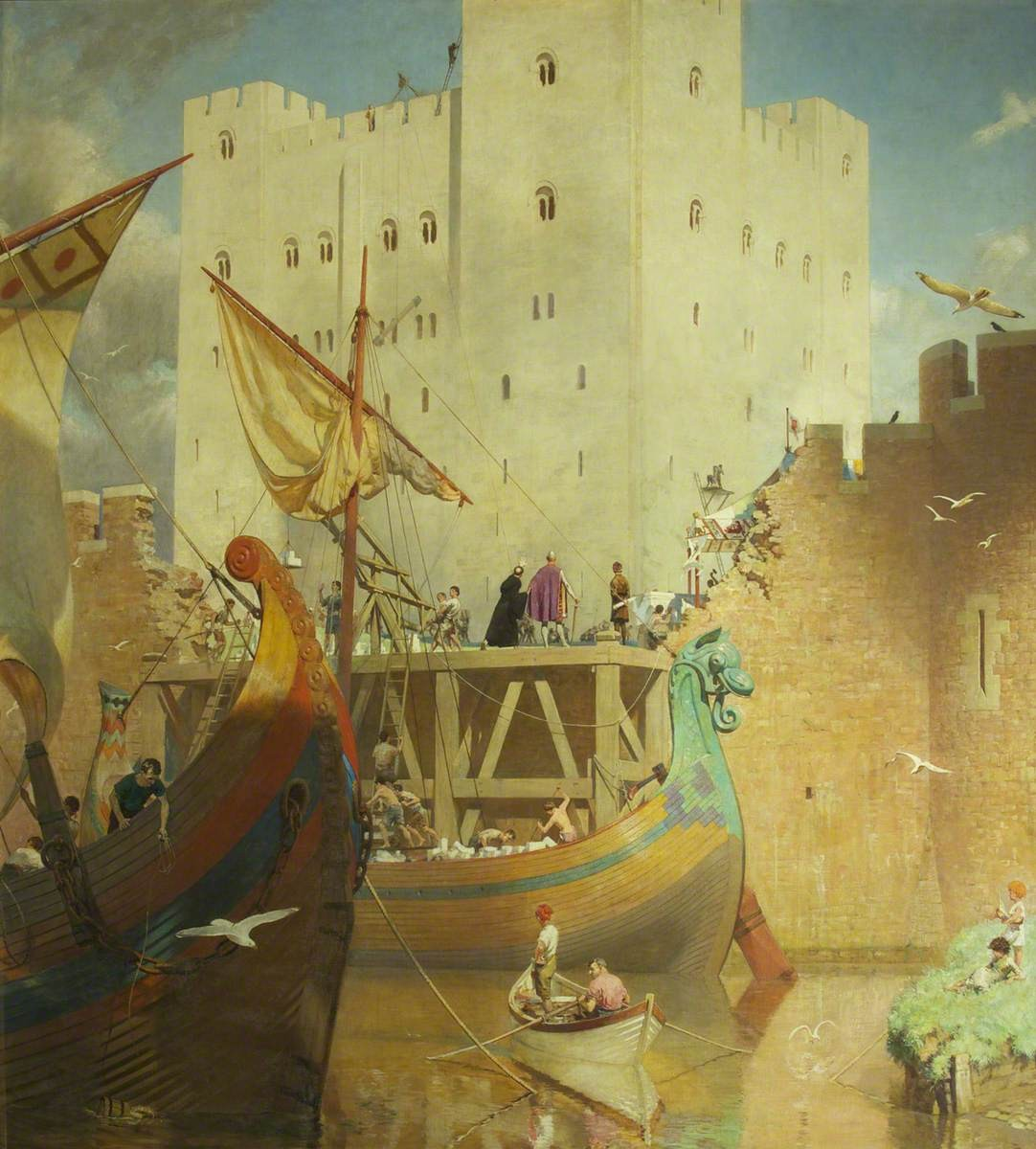
The Building of the Great Keep of Bristol Castle, 1125 by Frederick George Swaish

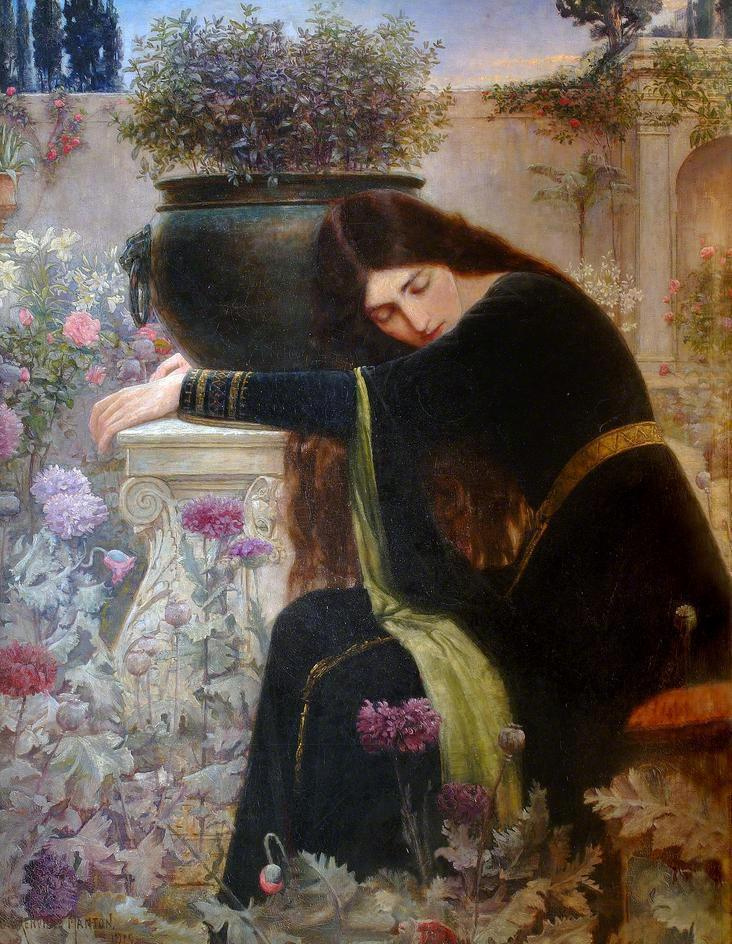
Isabella by George Grenville Manton

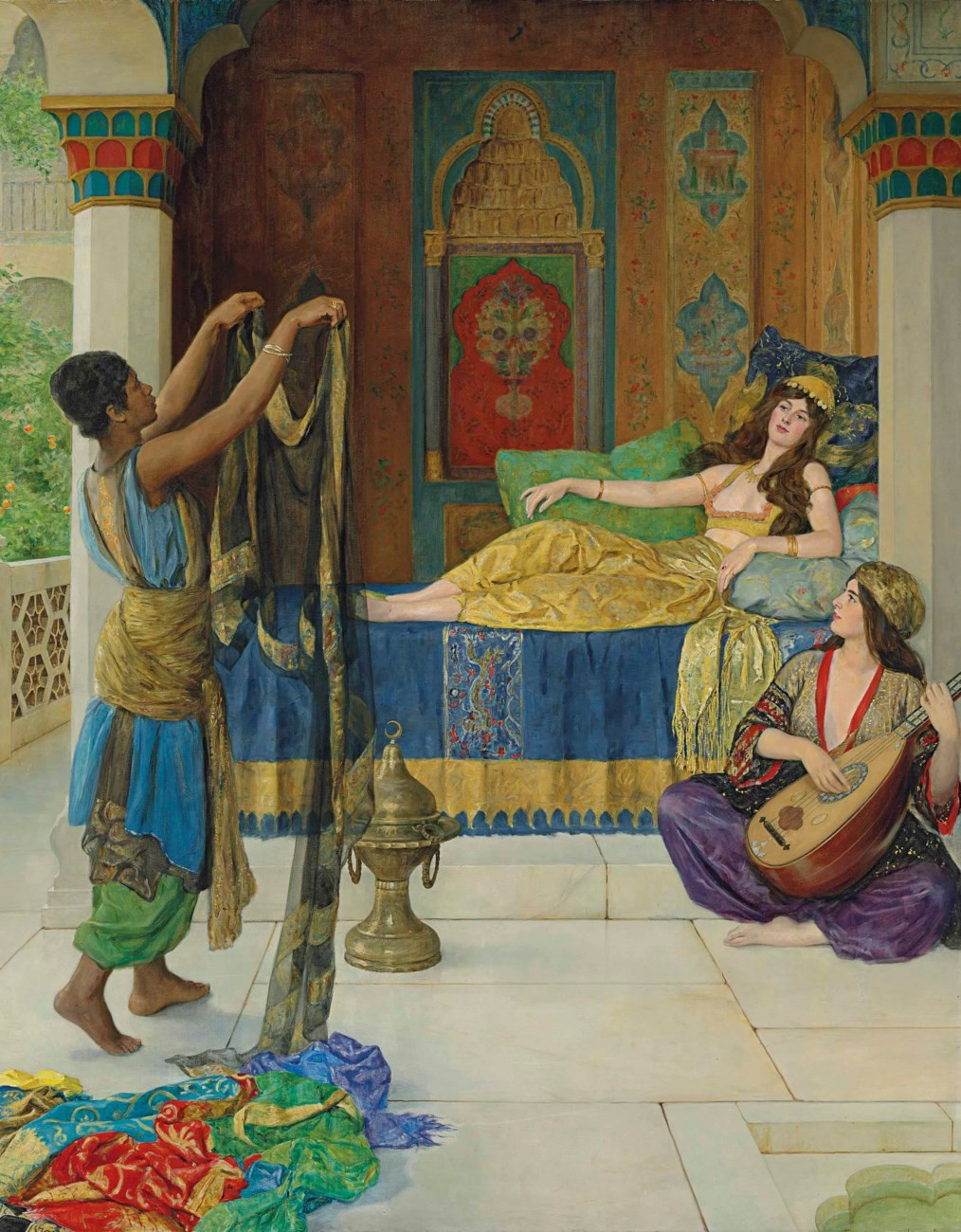
Myrrh, Aloes and Cassia by John Collier

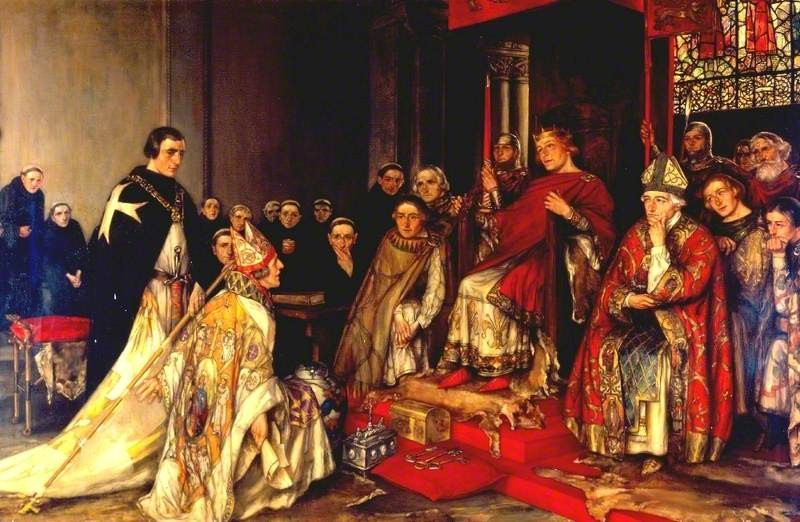
The Visit of Heraclius, Patriarch of Jerusalem to Henry II at Reading Abbey by Stephen Reid

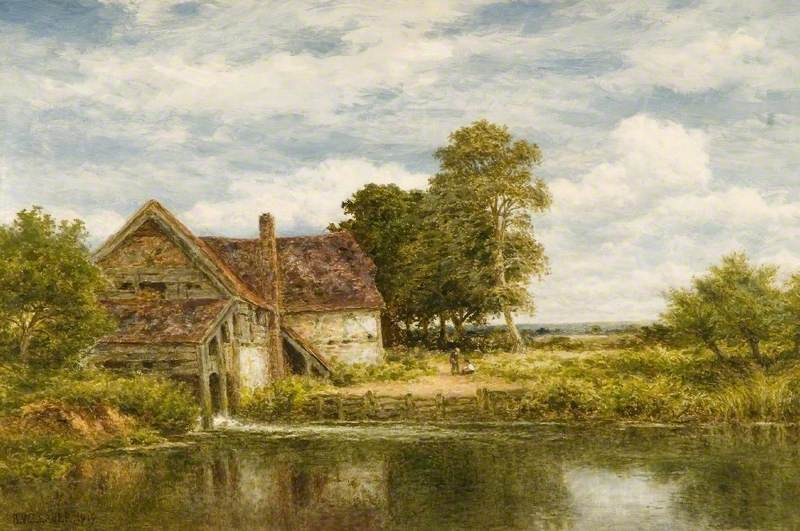
An Old Worcestershire Mill by Benjamin Williams Leader

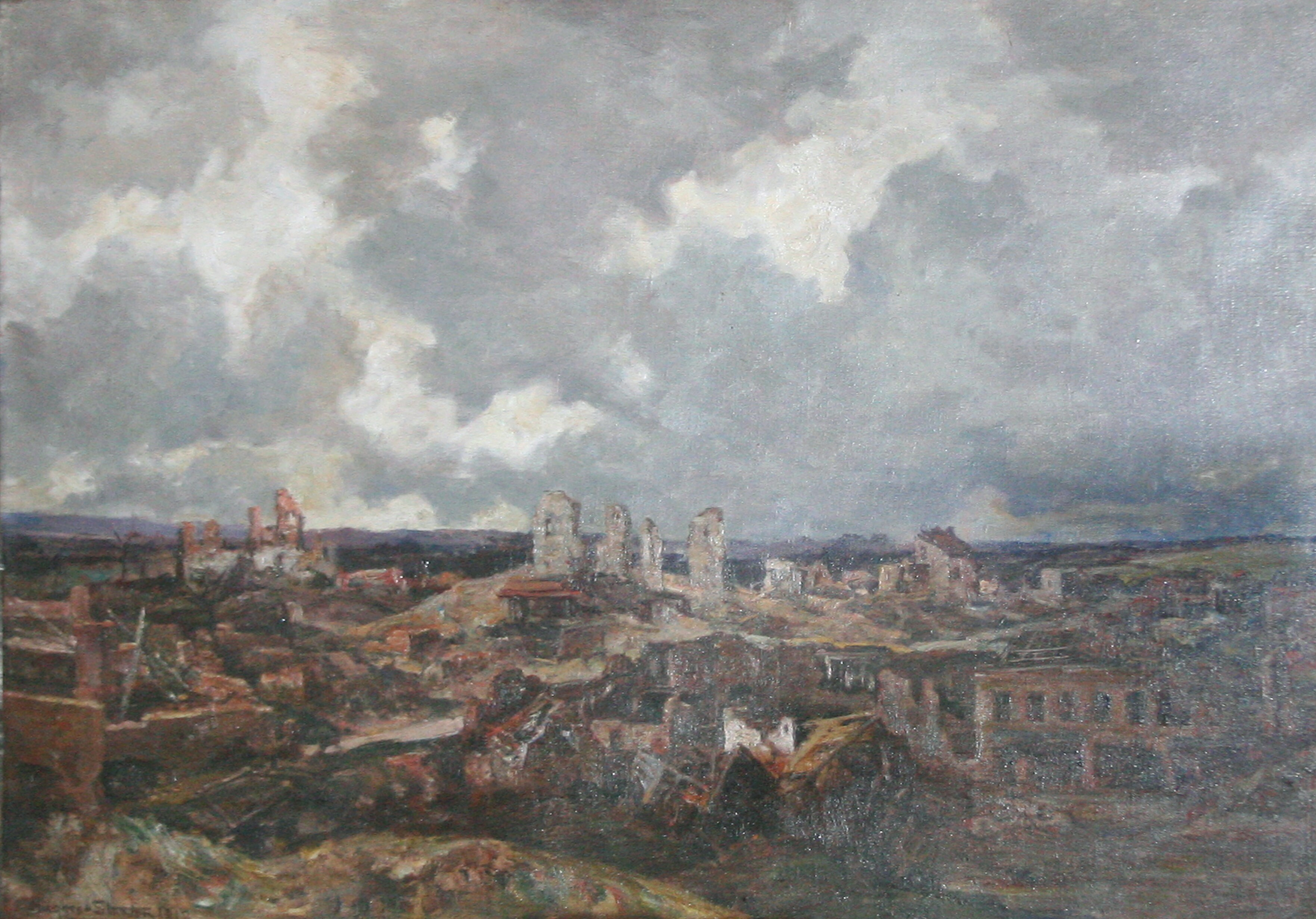
Lens, 1918 by Herbert Hughes-Stanton

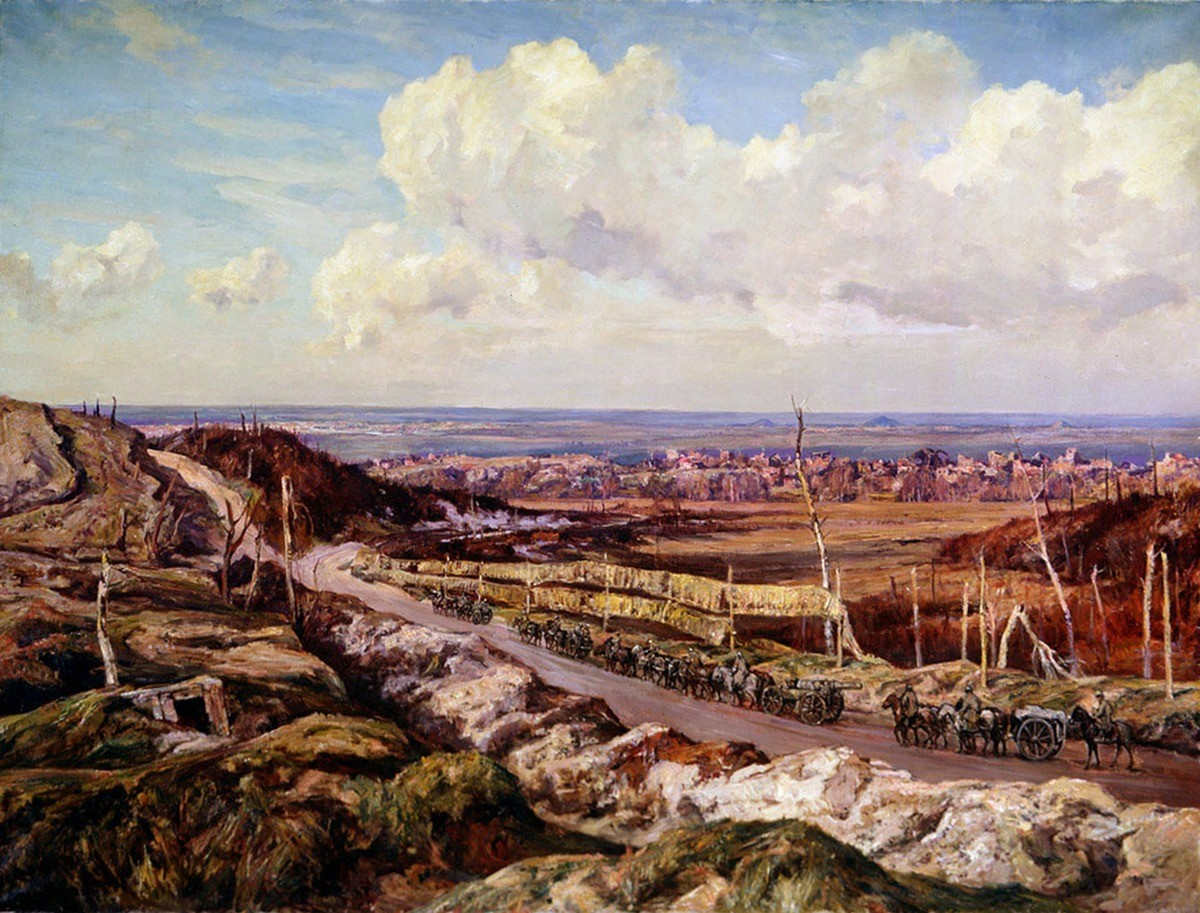
Lens-Arras Road, Looking on to Vimy Village by Herbert Hughes-Stanton

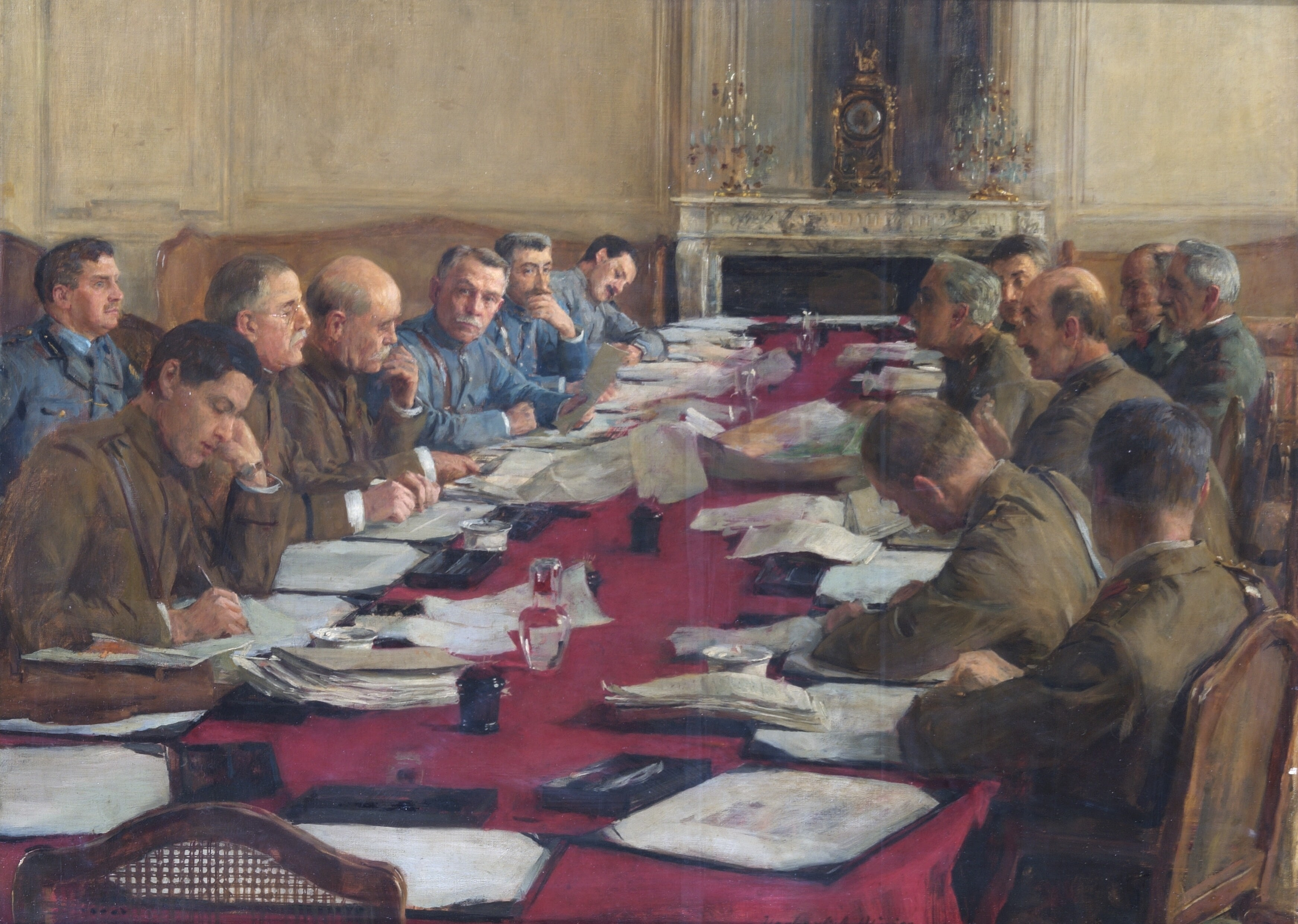
The Military Representatives of the Supreme War Council, Versailles by Herbert Arnould Olivier

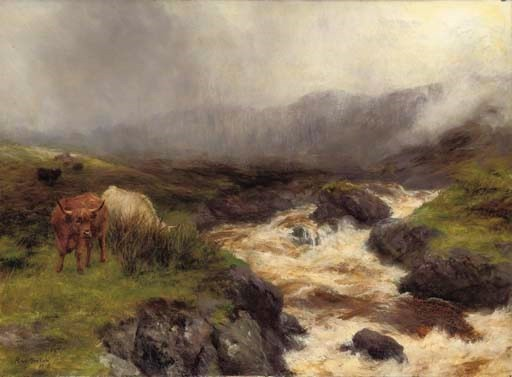
Clearing After Rain by Peter Graham

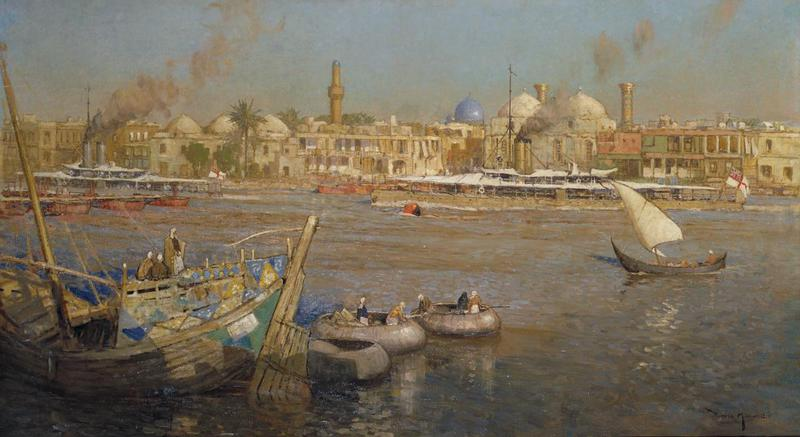
The Navy in Baghdad by Donald Maxwell

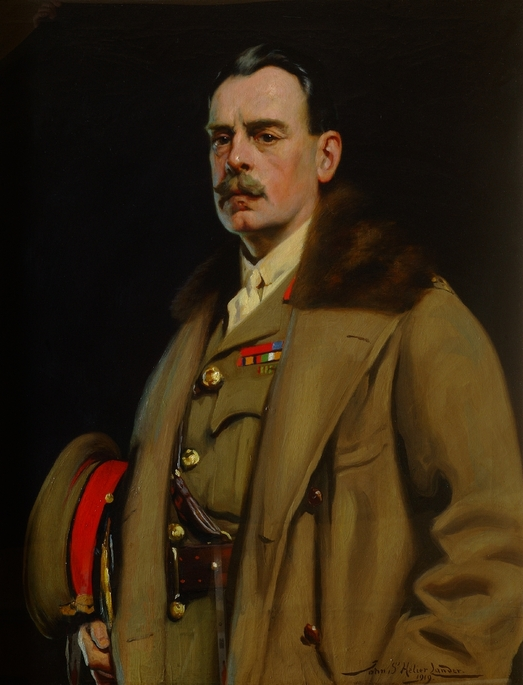
Portrait of Philip Chetwode by John St Helier Lander

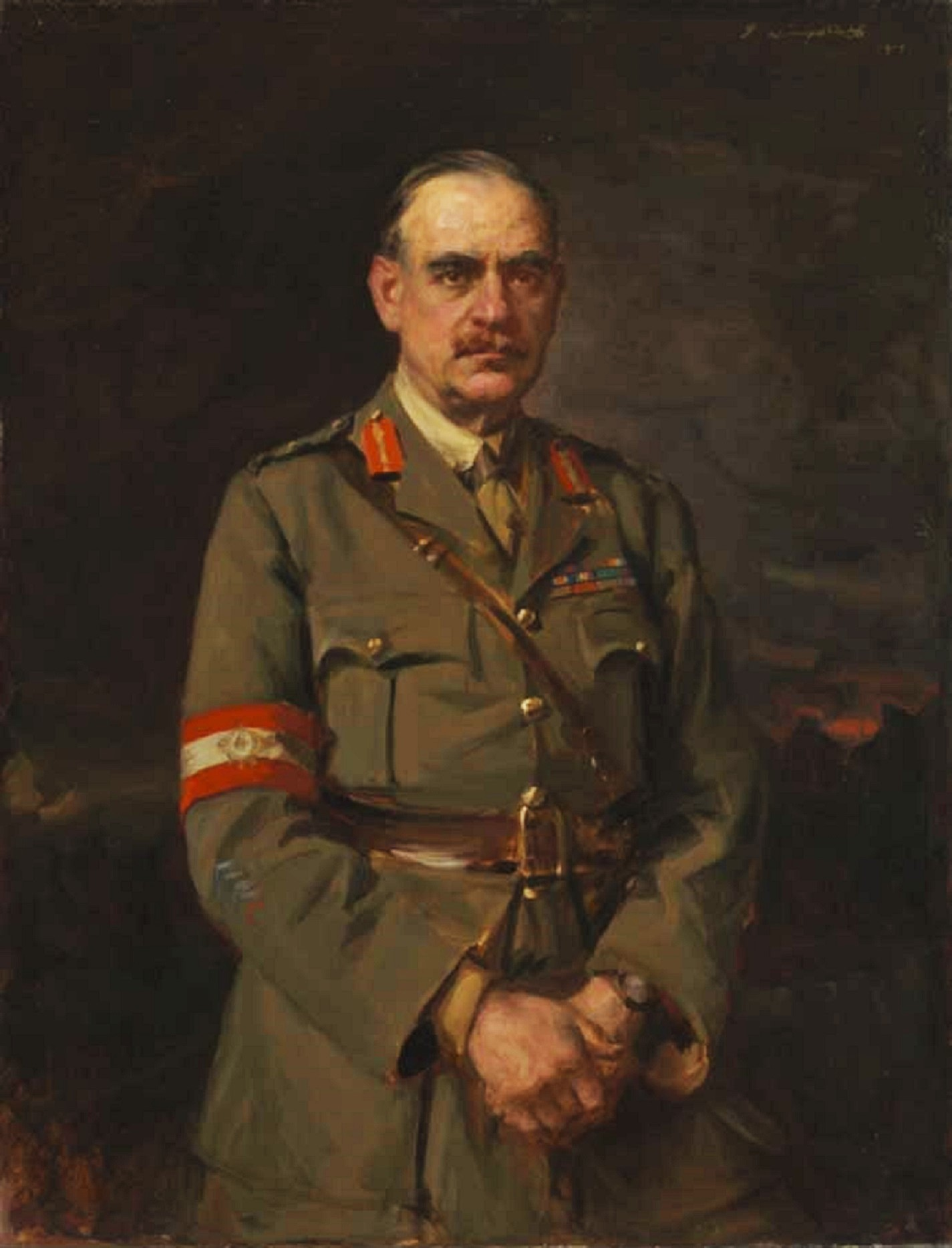
Portrait of John Monash by John Longstaff

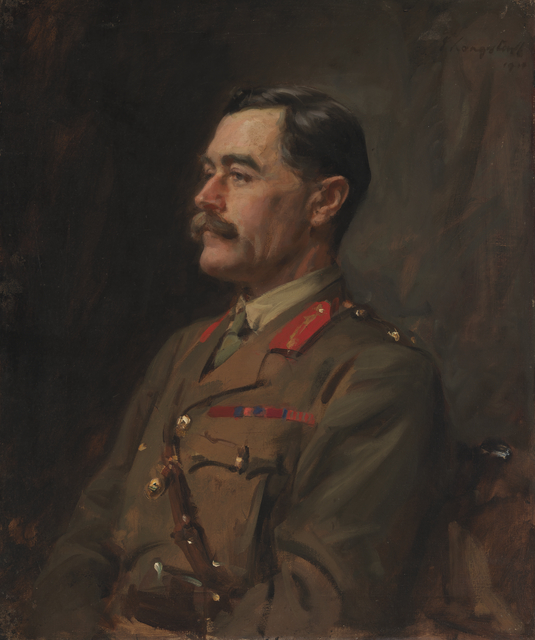
Portrait of Walter Coxen by John Longstaff

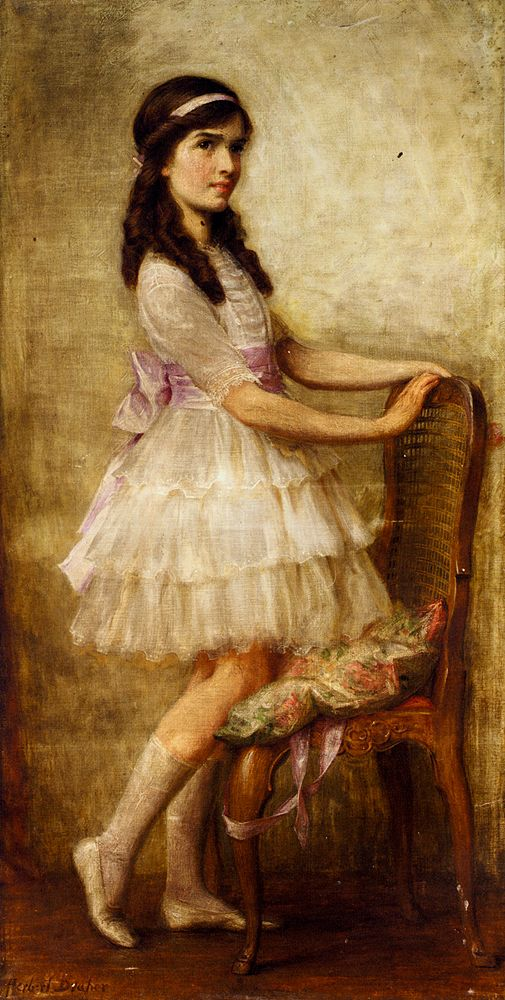
Portrait of Barbara De Selincourt by Herbert James Draper

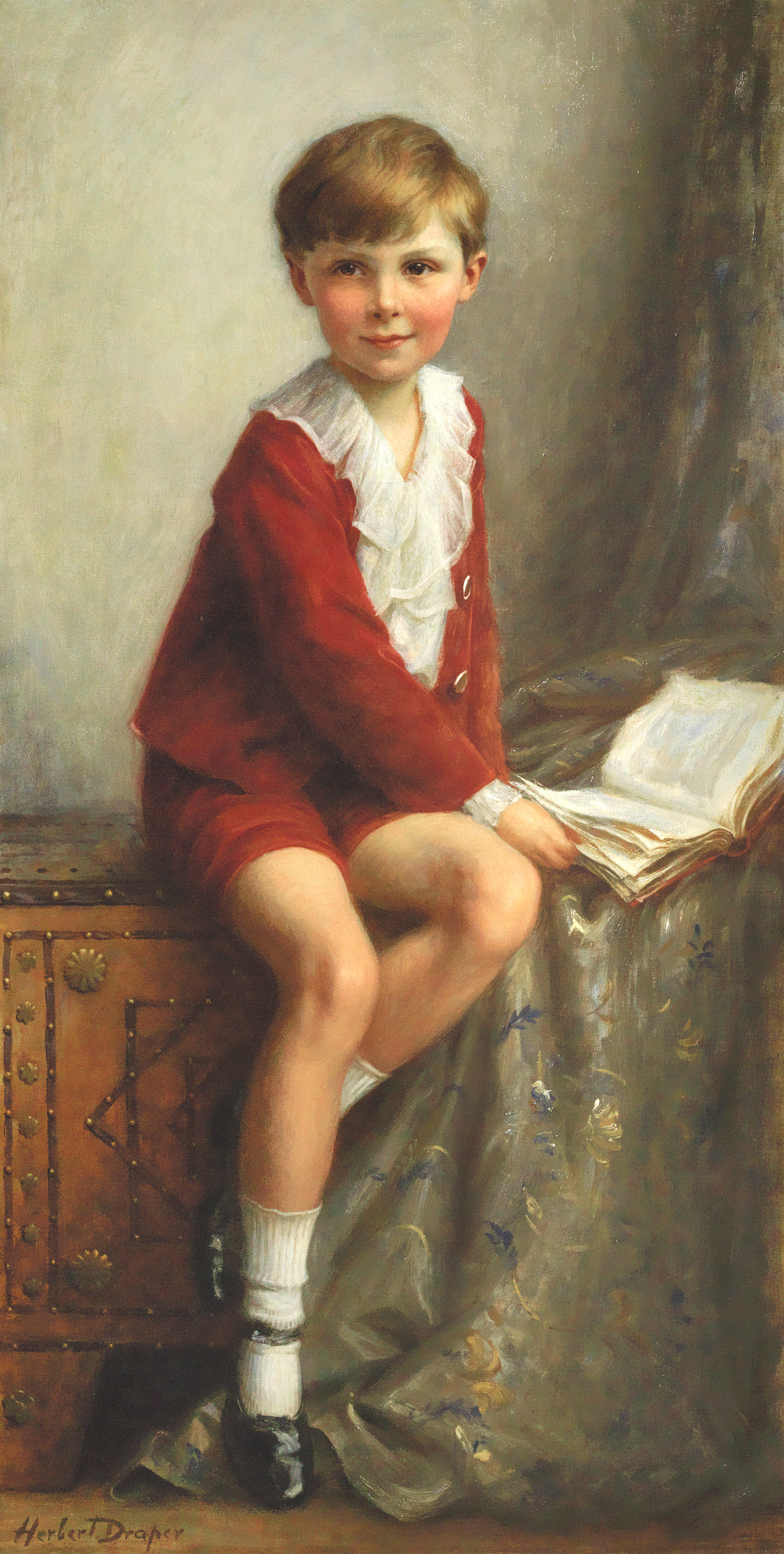
Portrait of Teddy Oates by Herbert James Draper

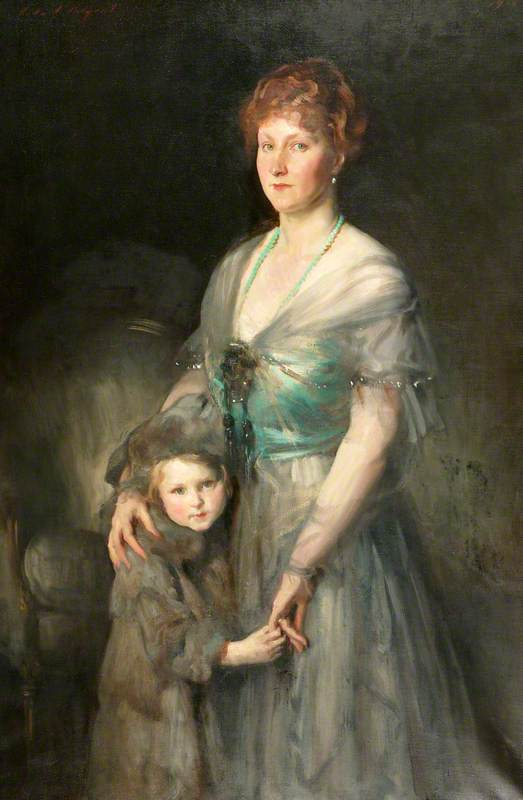
Mrs Duxbury and Daughter by John Singer Sargent

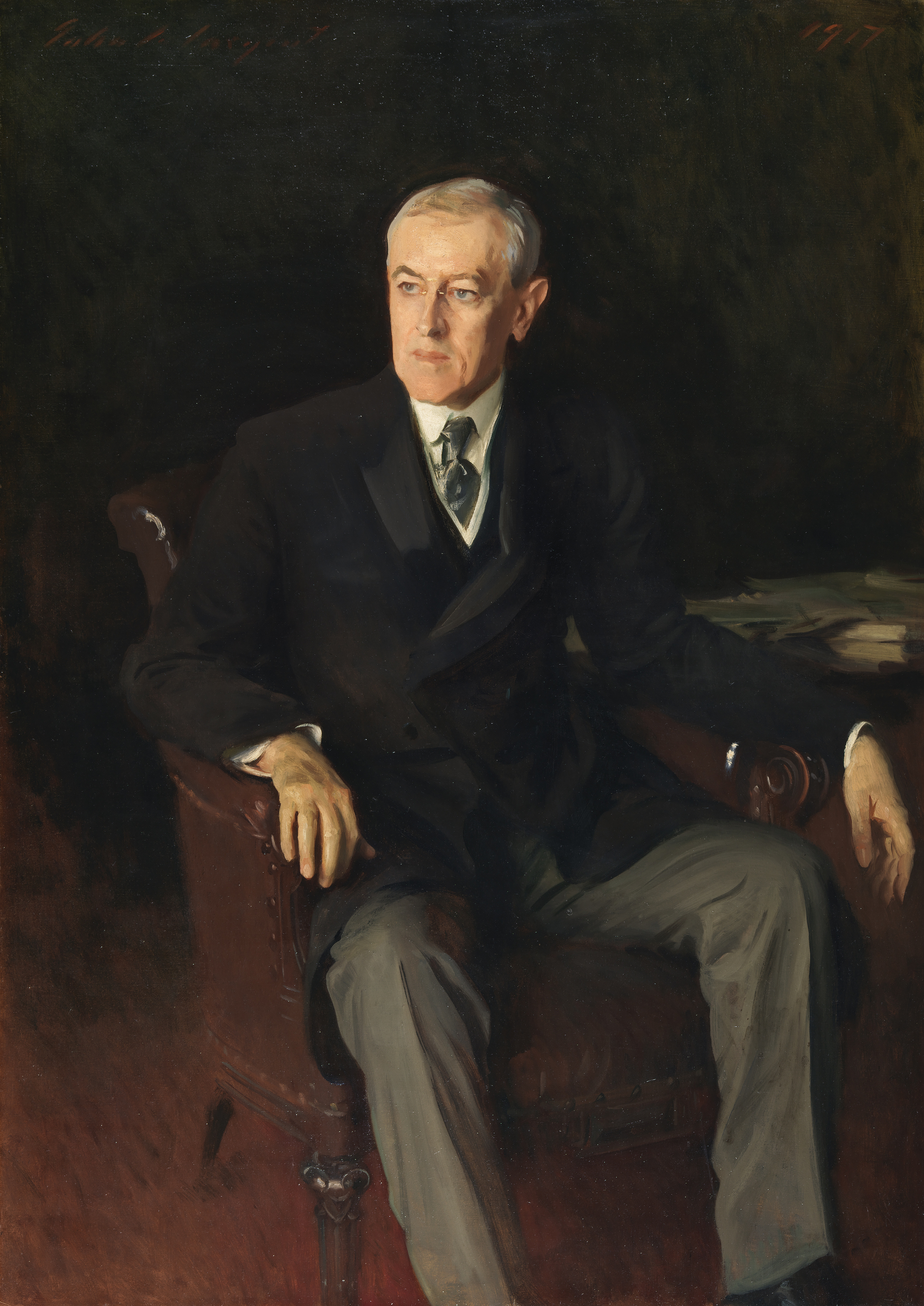
Portrait of Woodrow Wilson by John Singer Sargent

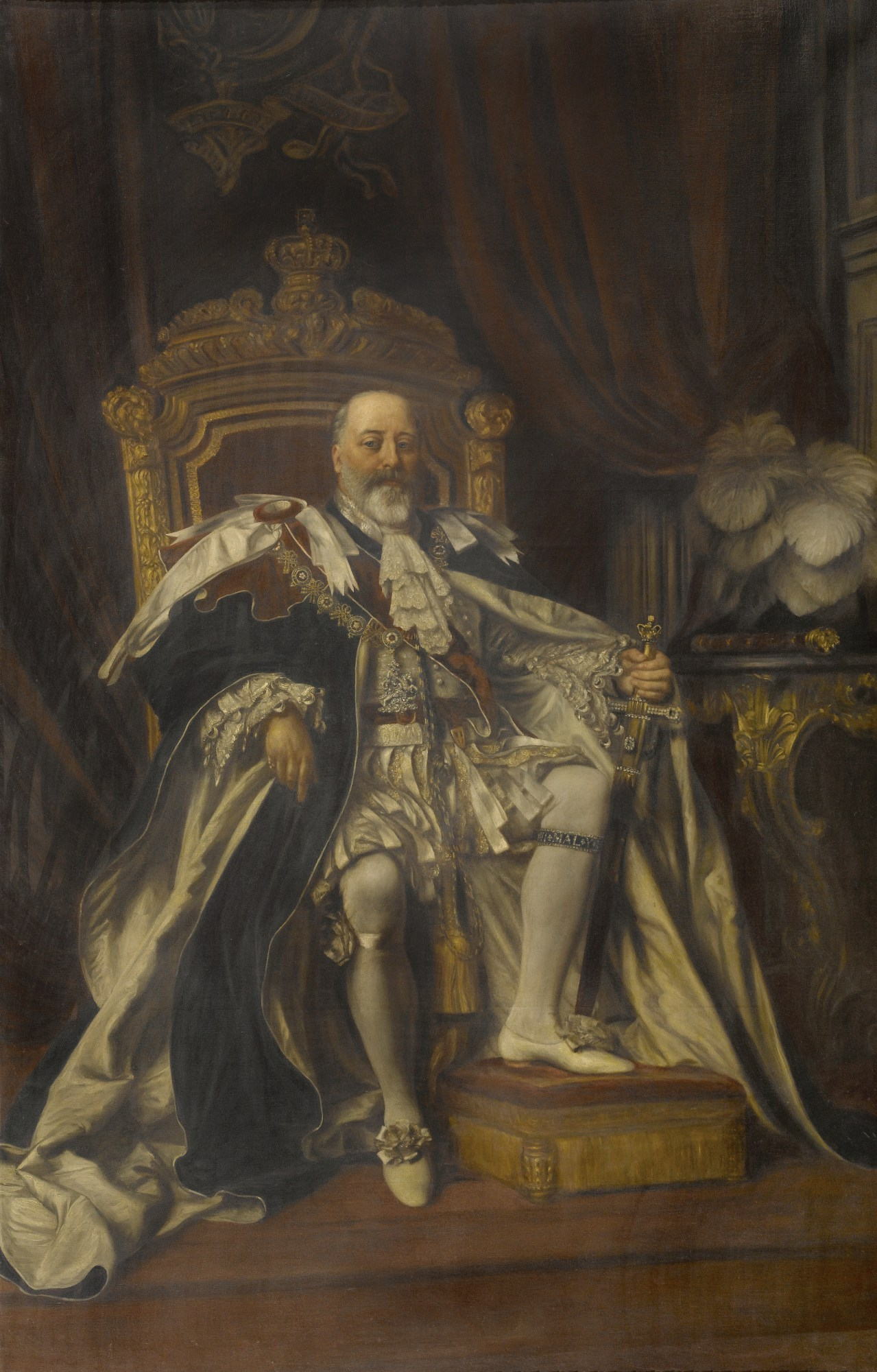
Portrait of Edward VII by Edward Poynter

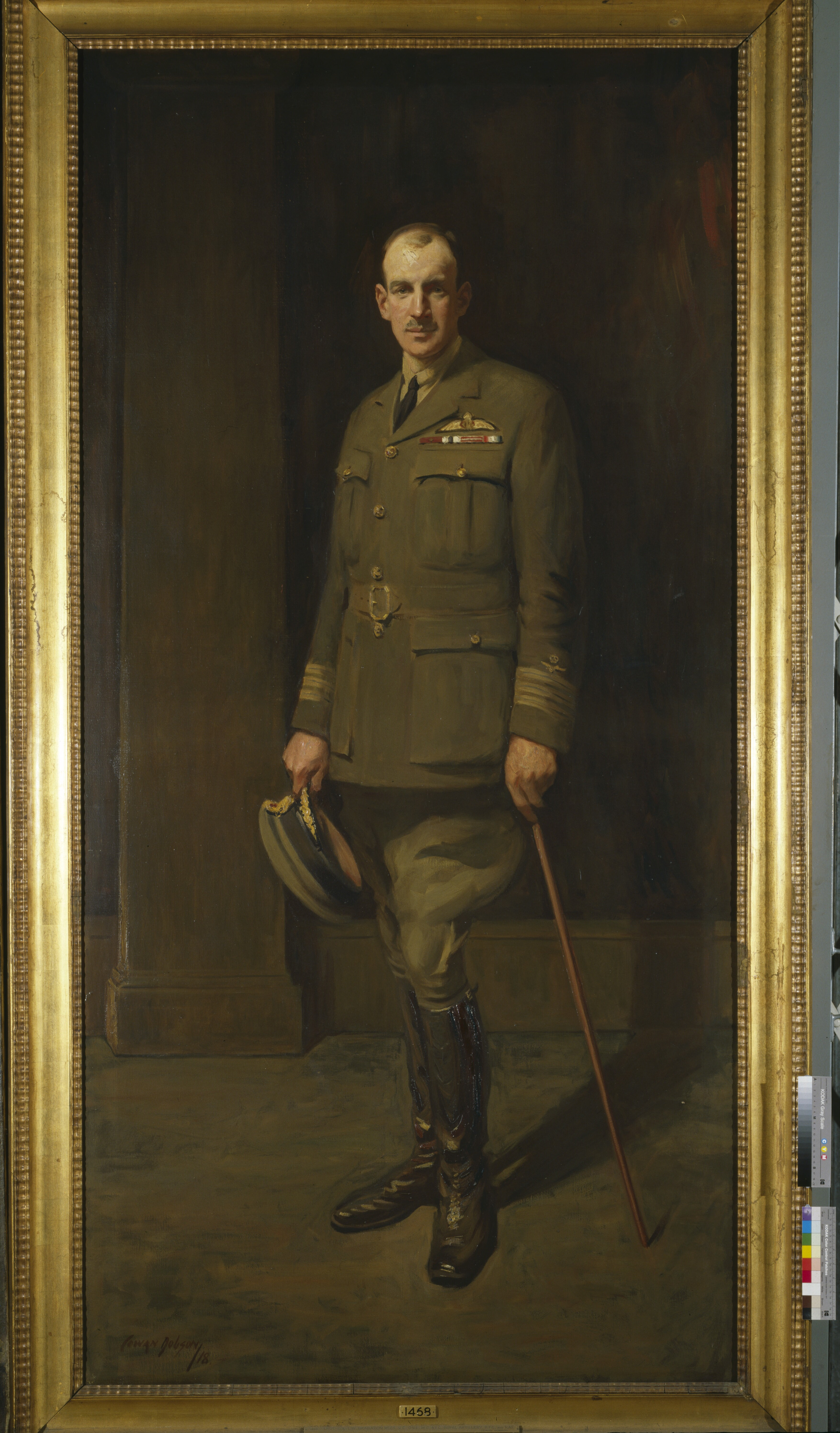
Portrait of Lionel Rees by Cowan Dobson

== Bibliography ==
- Bedell, Rebecca Moved to Tears: Rethinking the Art of the Sentimental in the United States. Princeton University Press, 2018.
- Fox, Caroline & Greenacre, Francis. Painting in Newlyn, 1880-1930. Barbican Art Gallery, 1985.
- Lomax, James & Ormond, Richard. John Singer Sargent and the Edwardian Age. Leeds Art Galleries, 1979.
