= The Beverley Arms =

Hotel in Beverley, East Riding of Yorkshire, England

Coordinates: 53°50′38″N 0°26′04″W

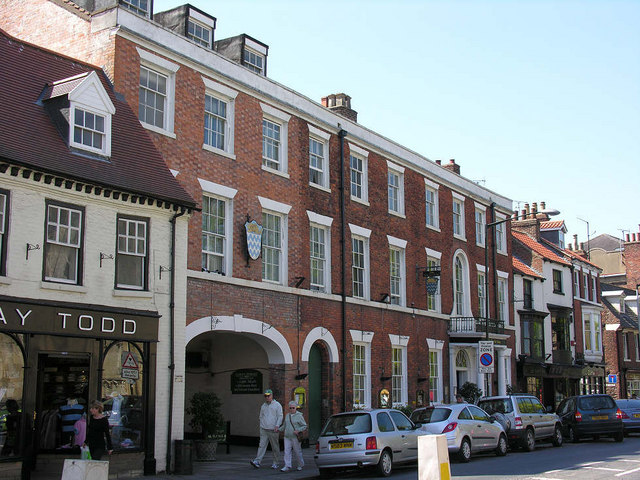
The building, in 2007

The Beverley Arms is a historic hotel in Beverley, a town in the East Riding of Yorkshire, in England.

An inn named "The Bell" was first recorded in 1686, and it is likely that this later became the "Blue Bell". Between 1794 and 1796, it was largely rebuilt to a design by William Middleton, and became the "Beverley Arms". This was a large coaching inn with stables and a coach house, and became the most important inn in the East Riding. The kitchen appears in several paintings by Frederick William Elwell including one displayed at the Royal Academy Exhibition of 1919 and acquired by the Chantrey Bequest. The interior has been much modernised, but retains a broadly Georgian character. The building was grade II listed in 1950, and was extended by three bays between 1966 and 1967. Between 2016 and 2018, the hotel was refurbished at a cost of £6 million, at which time it was owned by the Thwaites group.

The hotel is built of red brick with stone dressings, a sill band, a cornice under a coped parapet, and a pantile roof. It has storeys and is ten bays wide. The porch is in stone, and has two columns with fluted capitals, and an arched doorway with an ornamental radial fanlight and a fluted transom, and above it is an iron balcony. On the ground floor to the left are a round-arched doorway with a fanlight, a carriage entrance with a keystone, and a round-arched passage entry. The window above the porch has a round-arched head and an architrave, and the other windows are sashes.

== See also ==
- Listed buildings in Beverley (north area)
