= The Munitions Girls =

Painting by Stanhope Forbes

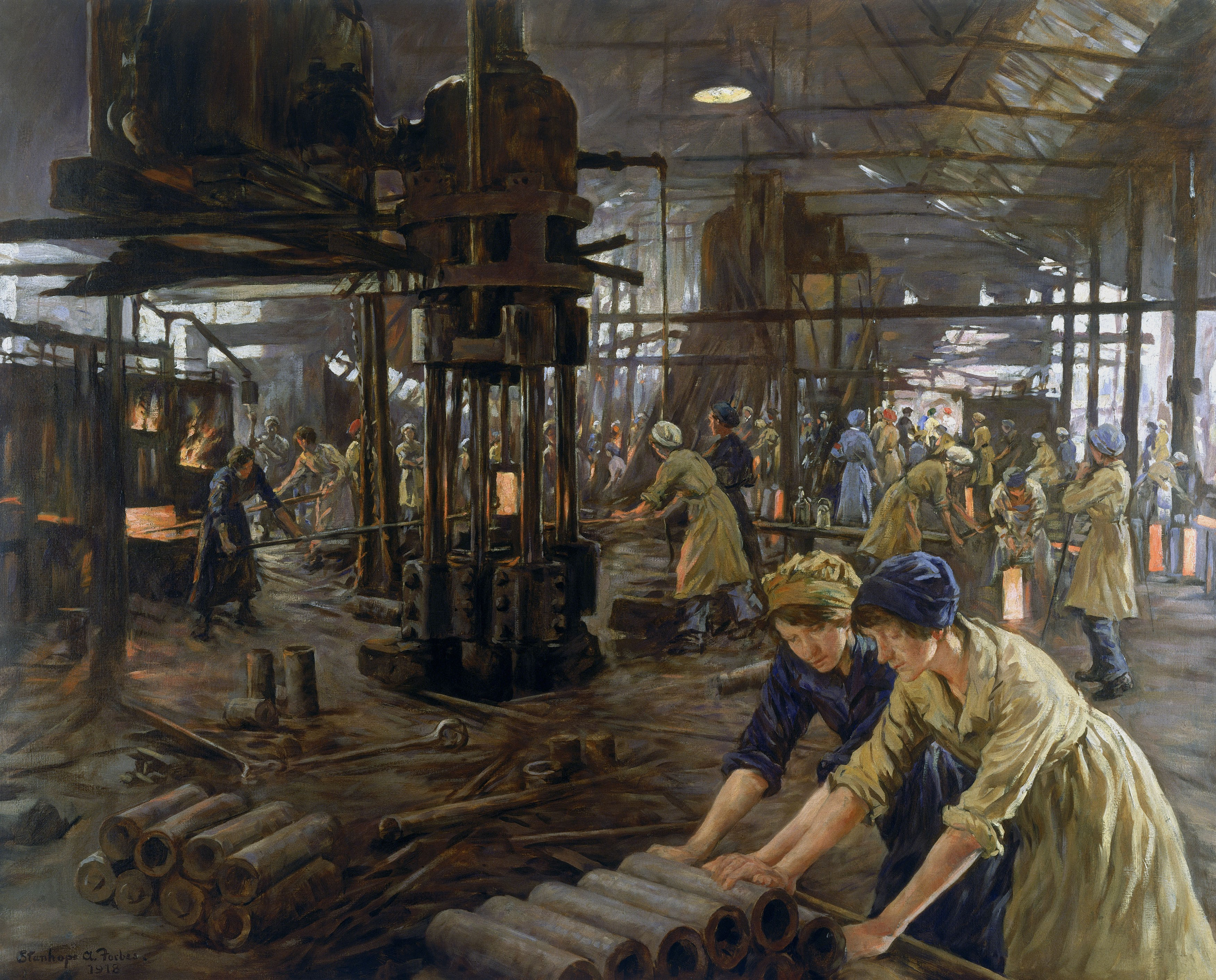
- Artist: Stanhope Forbes
- Year: 1918
- Type: Oil on canvas, genre painting
- Dimensions: 103 cm × 127 cm (41 in × 50 in)
- Location: Science Museum, London

The Munitions Girls is a 1918 oil painting by the Irish-born British artist Stanhope Forbes. It depicts a group of woman workers at Kilnhurst Steelworks near Rotherham, which had been converted into an arms factory during World War I. As men had been volunteered or been conscripted into the Armed Forces in large numbers, the workforce was mainly female. They are shown manufacturing shells.

Forbes was a noted figure in the Newlyn School of artists. The painting was displayed at the Royal Academy Exhibition of 1919 held at Burlington House in London. It is now in the collection of the Science Museum, having been acquired in 1983.

== Bibliography ==
- Freemantle, Michael. The Chemists' War: 1914–1918. Royal Society of Chemistry, 2015.
- Lonsdale, Sarah. Rebel Women Between the Wars: Fearless Writers and Adventurer. Manchester University Press, 2020.
