= A Battery Shelled =

Painting by Wyndham Lewis

- Artist: Wyndham Lewis
- Year: 1919
- Medium: Oil on canvas
- Dimensions: 182.8 cm × 317.5 cm (72.0 in × 125.0 in)
- Location: Imperial War Museum; London

A Battery Shelled is a 1919 painting by the English artist Wyndham Lewis. It depicts a scene from the Western Front of World War I. It was commissioned for the proposed Hall of Remembrance.

== Description ==
A number of men are seen working and moving around in a grey, cratered landscape with improvised buildings and shattered trees. Brown, stylised smoke pillars are coming out of the ground. To the left, in front of a pile of ammunition boxes, are three men with calm and serious postures, each looking in a different direction. The men in the foreground largely have normal human traits, while the soldiers who populate the rest of the scene lack individual features. The Imperial War Museum's object description defines their unnatural, mostly light brown bodies as "marionette-like". A small officer can be seen in the background, directing a party carrying a wounded man.

== Creation ==
The painting was commissioned by the British War Memorials Committee. The committee had been created in 1918 with the aim to create a Hall of Remembrance with British war paintings celebrating heroism and self-sacrifice. The inspiration came from the Renaissance, and the dimensions of the commissioned paintings were based on Paolo Uccello's The Battle of San Romano at the National Gallery. The commissions included some of the most prominent British modernist painters at the time. The Hall of Remembrance was never realised and the paintings were transferred to the Imperial War Museum. Lewis served in the Royal Artillery at the Battle of Passchendaele and could draw from this experience when making the painting.

== See also ==
- Gassed (painting)
- The Menin Road (painting)
