= Hall of Remembrance =

Unbuilt War Memorial in London

The Hall of Remembrance was a series of paintings and sculptures commissioned, in 1918, by the British War Memorials Committee of the British Ministry of Information in commemoration of the dead of World War I.

== History ==
Travoys Arriving with Wounded at a Dressing-Station at Smol, Macedonia, September 1916 by Stanley Spencer

The artworks commissioned for the Hall of Remembrance were to be devoted to 'fighting subjects, home subjects and the war at sea and in the air' and were to be displayed in a specially built structure. The building was to be designed to accommodate a series of paintings based upon the dimensions of the large triptych, The Battle of San Romano by Paolo Uccello, one part of which is now in the National Gallery. The scheme was initiated by Lord Beaverbrook, the then Minister of Information and echoed the scale of a war art programme he had launched for the government of Canada. Although the architect Charles Holden completed a design for the building, the plan was abandoned and those artworks that had been completed, along with works donated by Muirhead Bone, William Orpen and Sir John Lavery were incorporated into the art collection that was part of the establishment of the Imperial War Museum.

Although Holden's plans for the building have been lost, Muirhead Bone described the structure as a "kind of Pavilion", surrounded by a garden, with a main gallery leading to an oratory with a dedication to the "coming Brotherhood of Man for which we all pray." The centre piece of the Hall were to be four 'super-pictures', each 20 feet long by 7 feet high and each on the theme of cooperation between Britain and its various allies. William Orpen was offered the commission for the Britain and its Italian allies picture but refused, as he did not want to leave the Western Front for a trip to Italy. Augustus John accepted the commission to produce the Anglo-French super-picture but the painting, Junction of Our Lines with the French never materialised. John Singer Sargent was tasked with depicting Anglo-American cooperation but failed to find an appropriate scene whilst visiting the Somme and instead presented the picture known as Gassed. The fourth super-picture, of troops from the Empire, was never commissioned.

== Artworks ==
The paintings commissioned and completed for the Hall of Remembrance include:

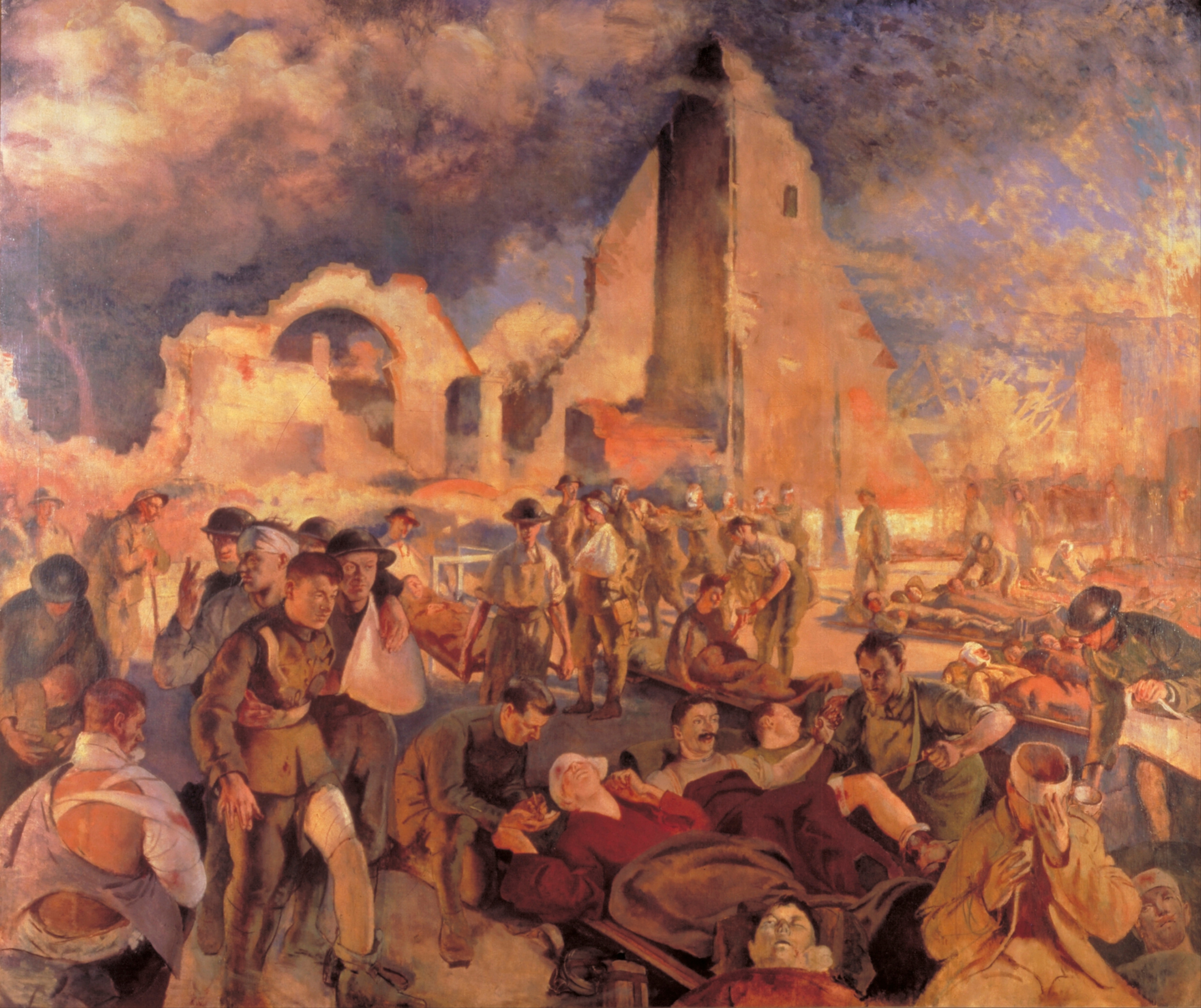
An Advanced Dressing Station in France, 1918 by Henry Tonks

- Gassed by John Singer Sargent,
- Travoys Arriving with Wounded at a Dressing Station at Smol, Macedonia, September 1916 by Stanley Spencer,
- An Advanced Dressing Station in France, 1918 by Henry Tonks
- Irish Troops in the Judaen Hills Surprised by a Turkish Bombardment by Henry Lamb
- The Menin Road by Paul Nash
- Landing Survivors from a Torpedoed Ship by Walter Bayes
- Oppy Wood, 1917. Evening by John Nash
- A Battery Shelled by Percy Wyndham Lewis
- The Royal Field Artillery in Macedonia, Spring 1918 by Darsie Japp
- Heavy Artillery by Colin Gill.
- In the Gun Factory at Woolwich Arsenal by George Clausen
- The Harvest of Battle by C R W Nevinson
- The Old German Front Line, Arras, 1916 by Charles Sims.
- Divers at Work Repairing a Torpedoed Ship by John Laviers Wheatley
- The Battlefields of Ypres—After by David Young Cameron
- A Two Year-old Steel Works, 1918: erected during the War for Messer. Steel, Peech and Tozer Ltd., Phoenix Works, Rotherham by Charles John Holmes
- Erecting a Camouflage Tree by Leon Underwood
- A German Attack on a Wet Morning, April 1918 (1918) by Harold Sandys Williamson

Gassed by John Singer Sargent

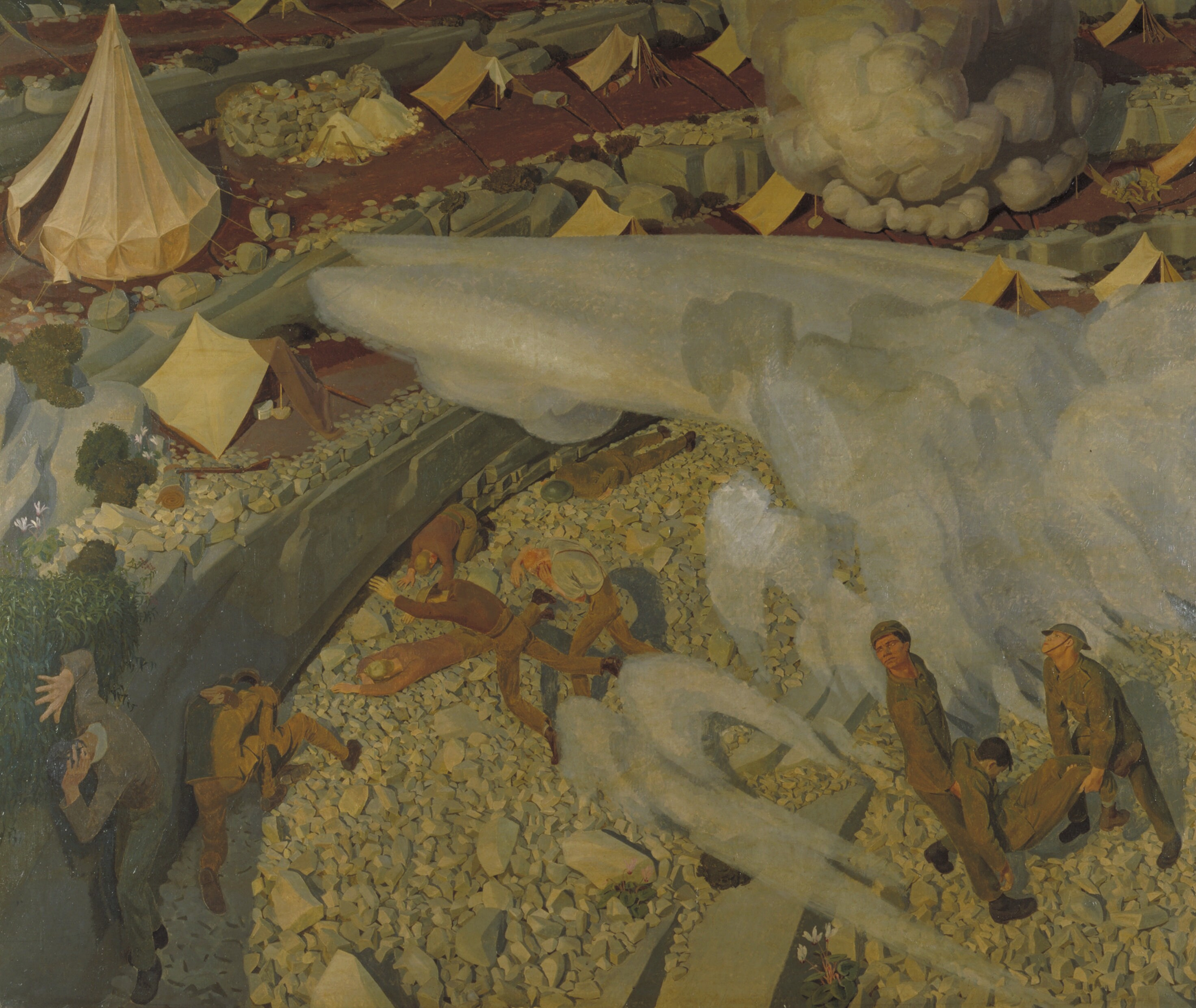
Irish Troops in the Judaean Hills Surprised by a Turkish Bombardment by Henry Lamb

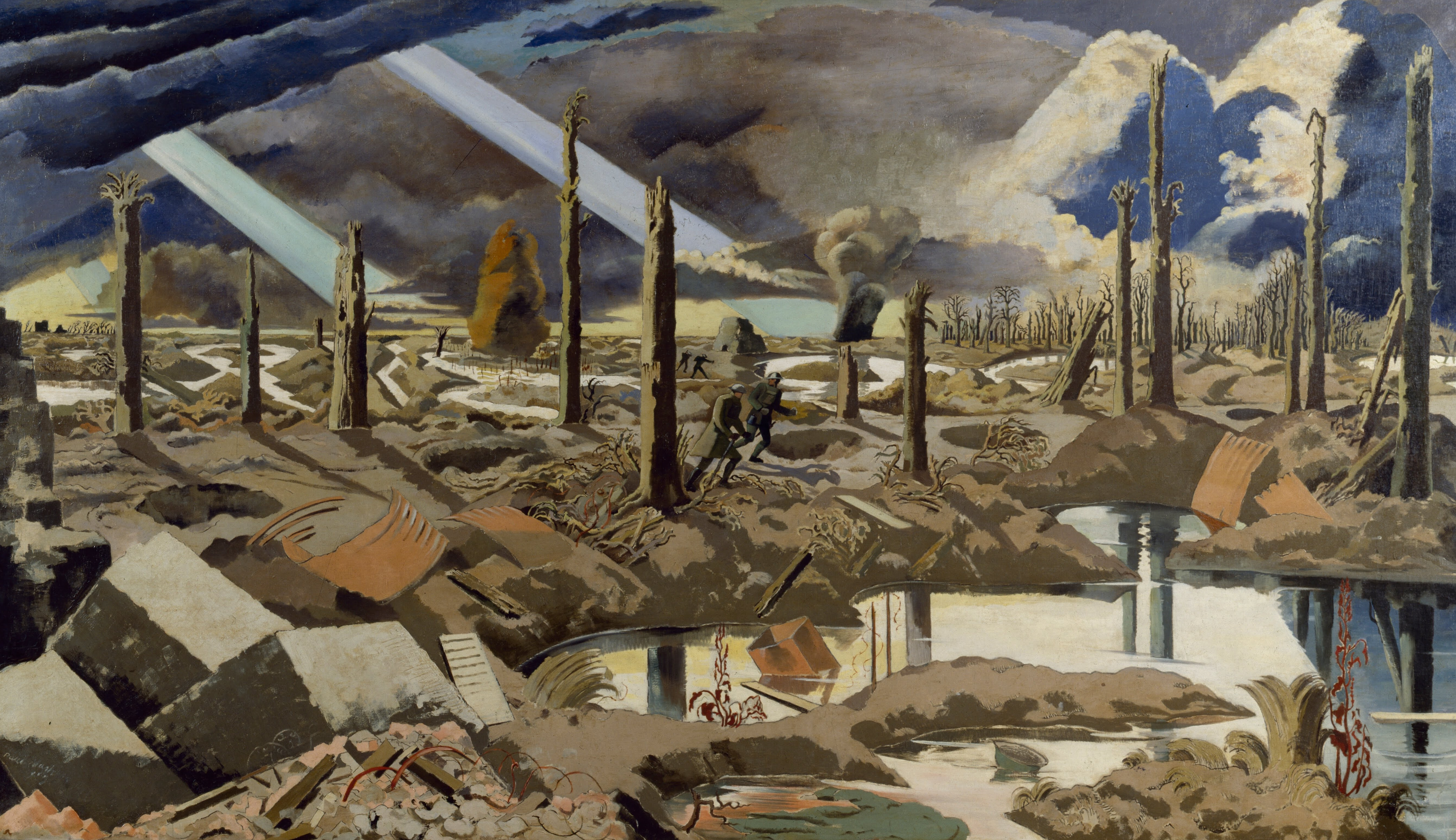
The Menin Road by Paul Nash

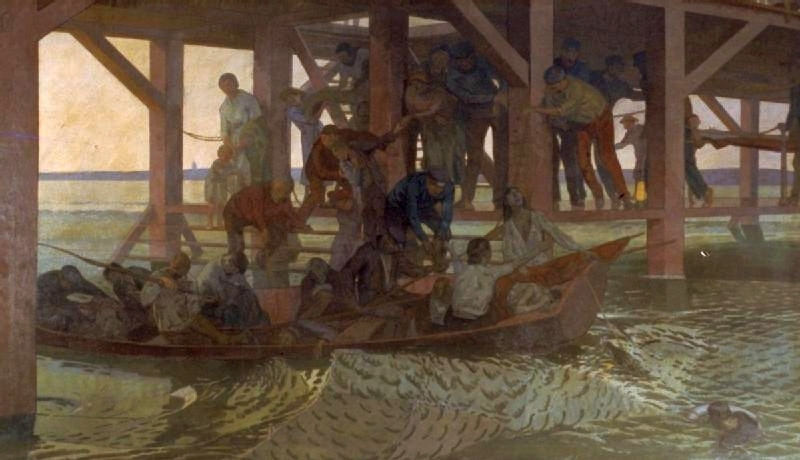
Landing Survivors from a Torpedoed Ship 1918 by Walter Bayes

Oppy Wood, 1917. Evening by John Nash

A Battery Shelled by Wyndham Lewis

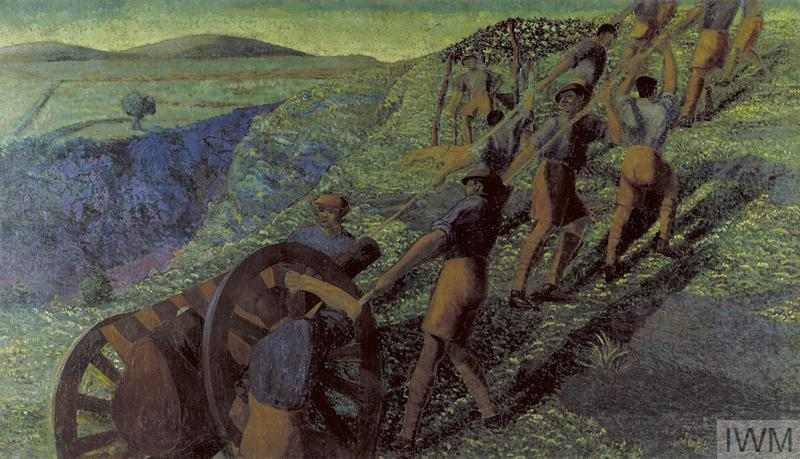
The Royal Field Artillery in Macedonia, Spring 1918 by Darsie Japp

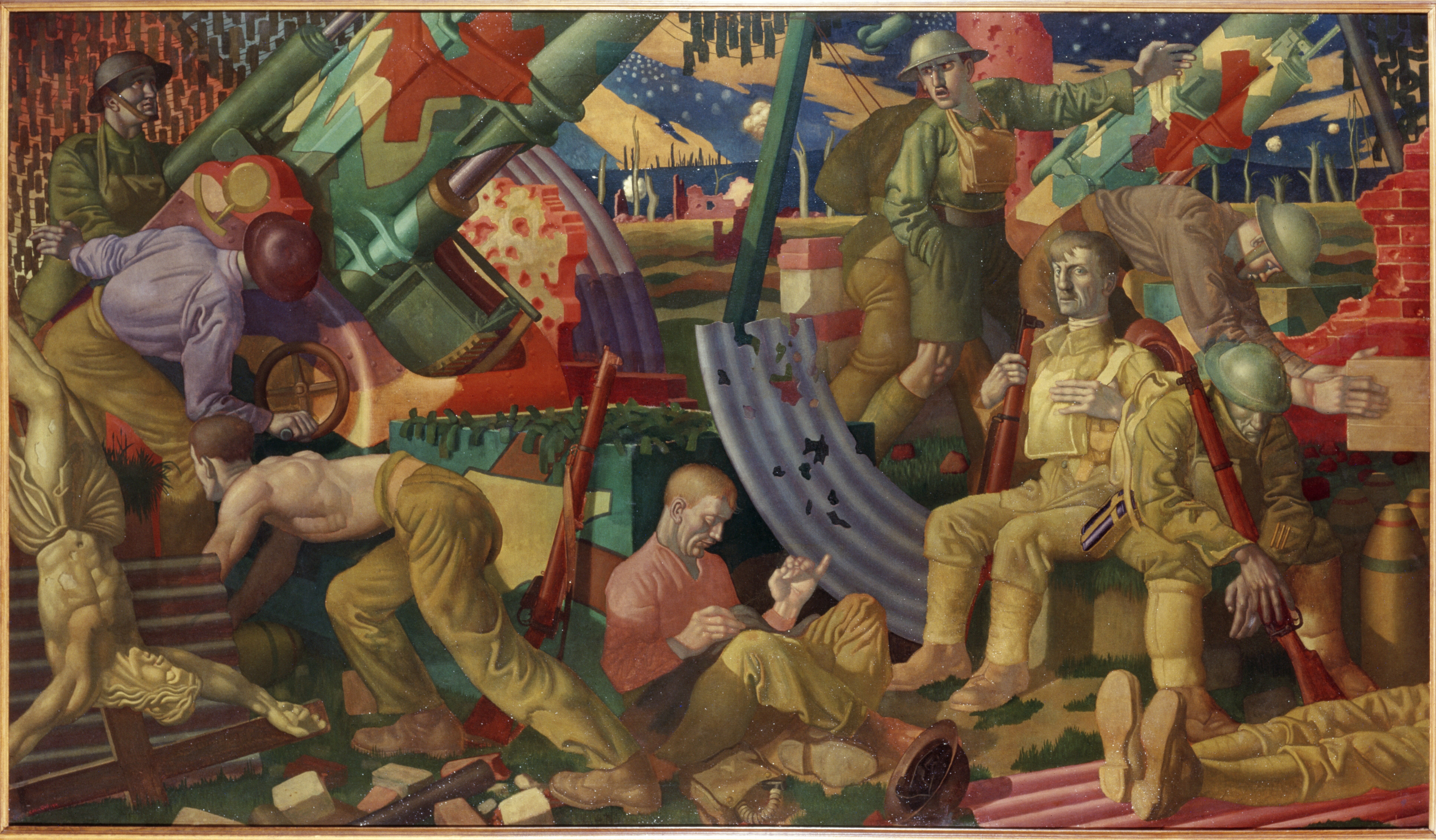
Heavy Artillery by Colin Gill

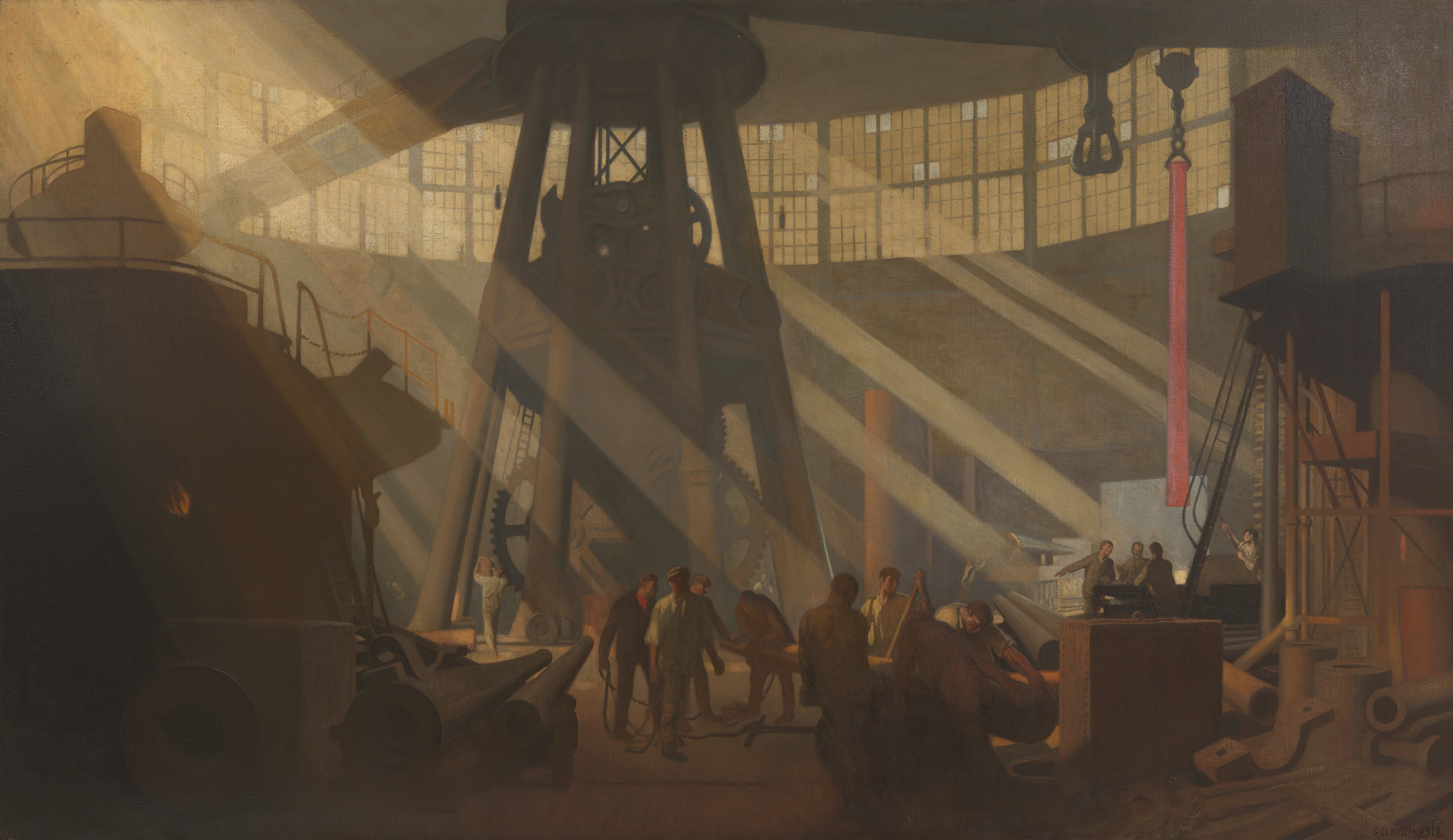
In the Gun Factory at Woolwich Arsenal by George Clausen

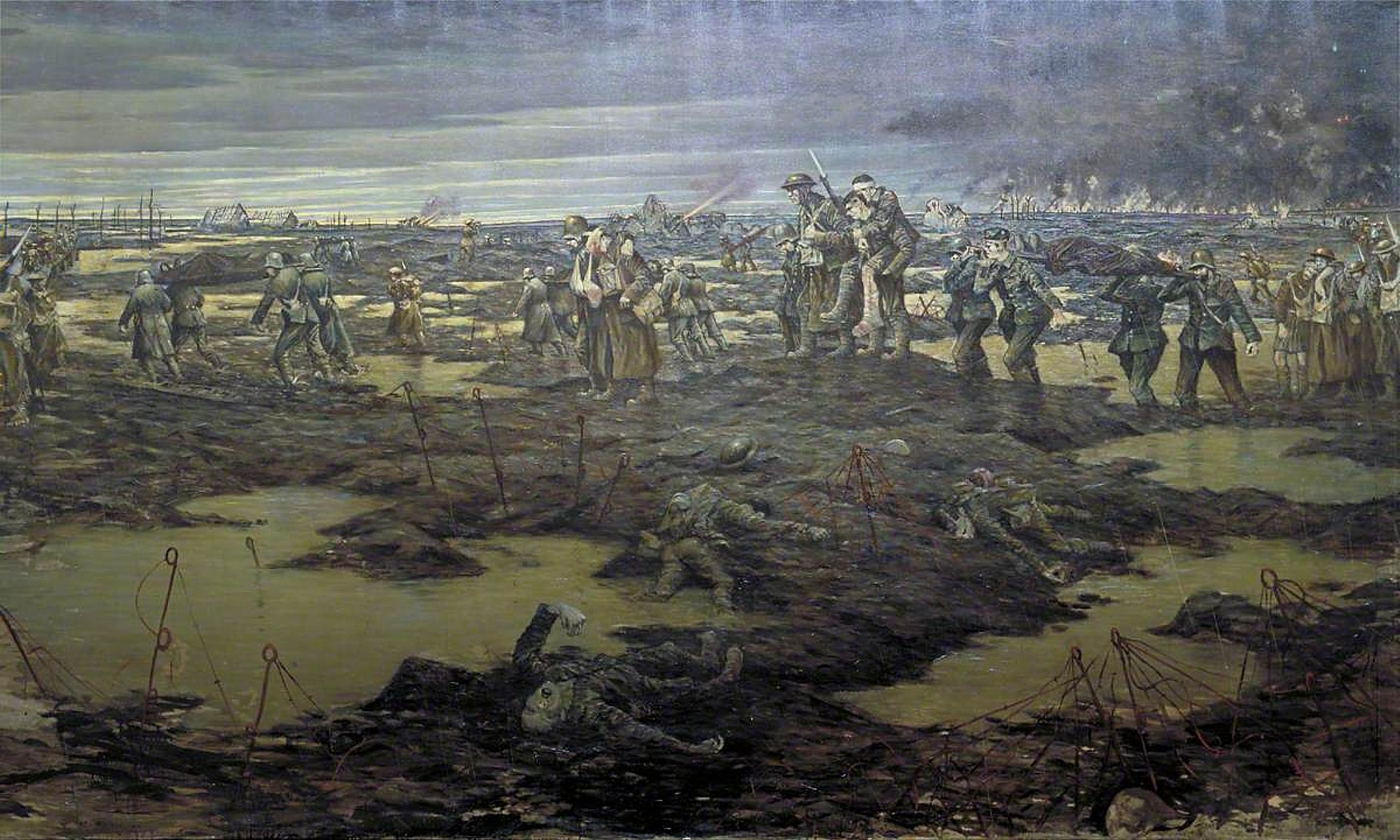
The Harvest of Battle by C R W Nevinson

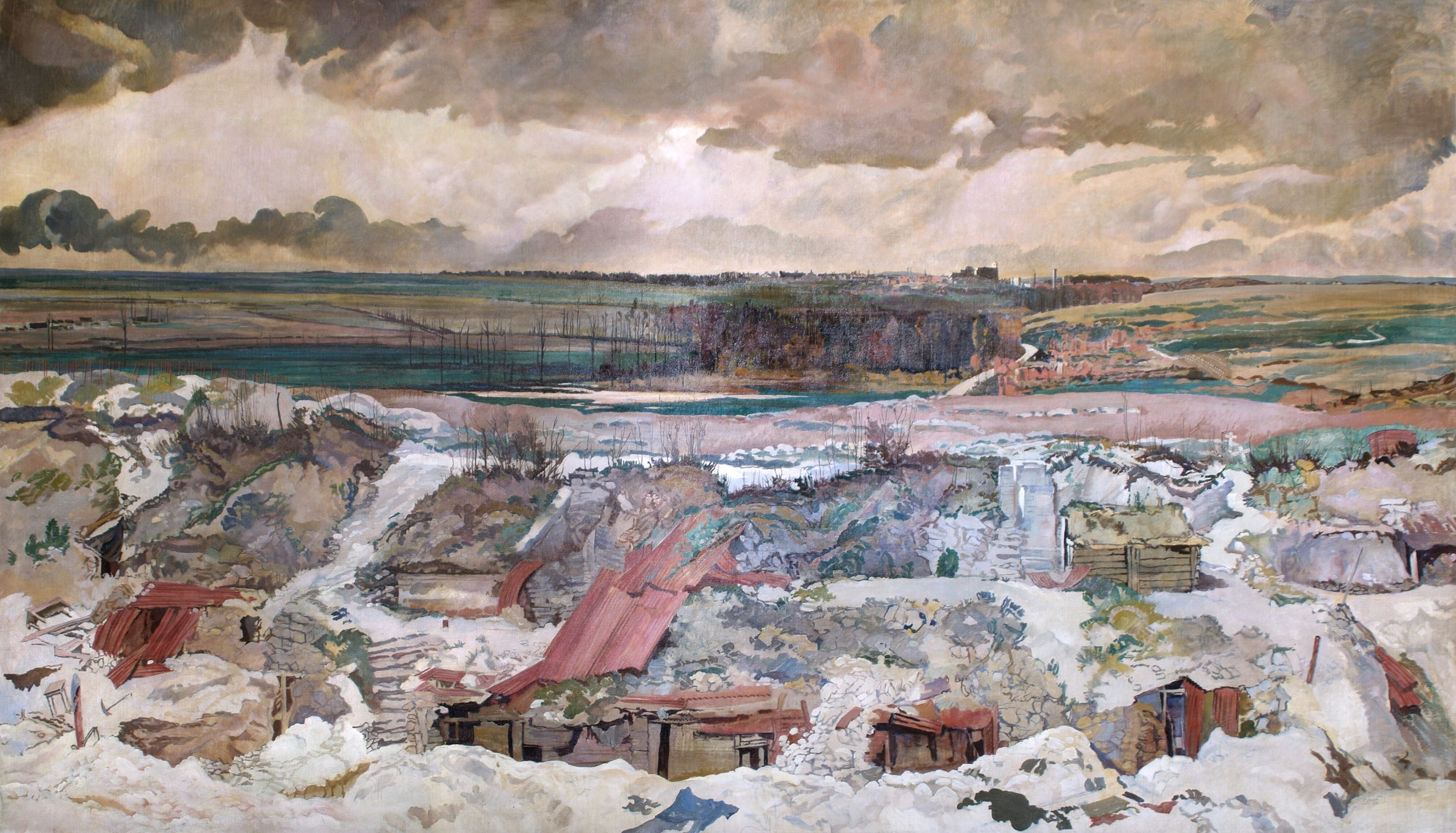
The Old German Front Line, Arras, 1916 by Charles Sims

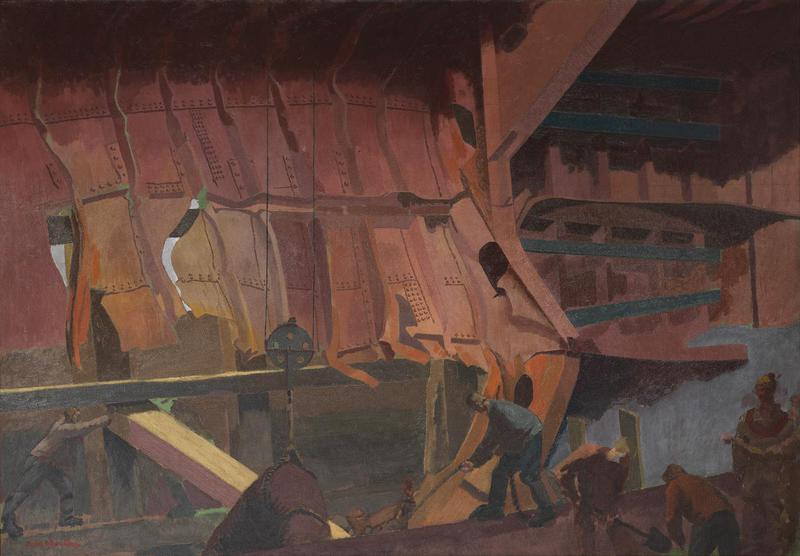
Divers at Work Repairing a Torpedoed Ship by John Laviers Wheatley

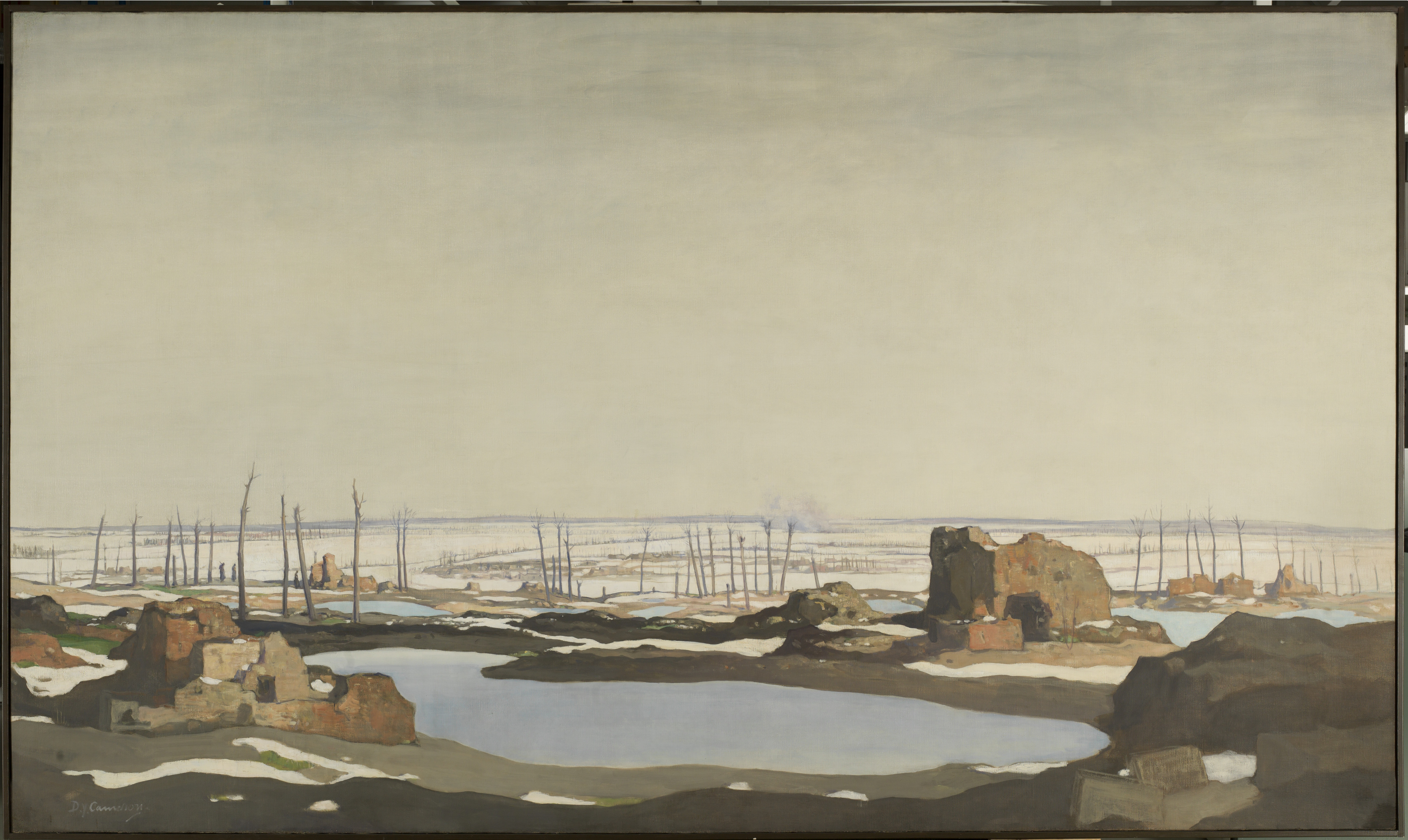
The Battlefields of Ypres—After by David Young Cameron

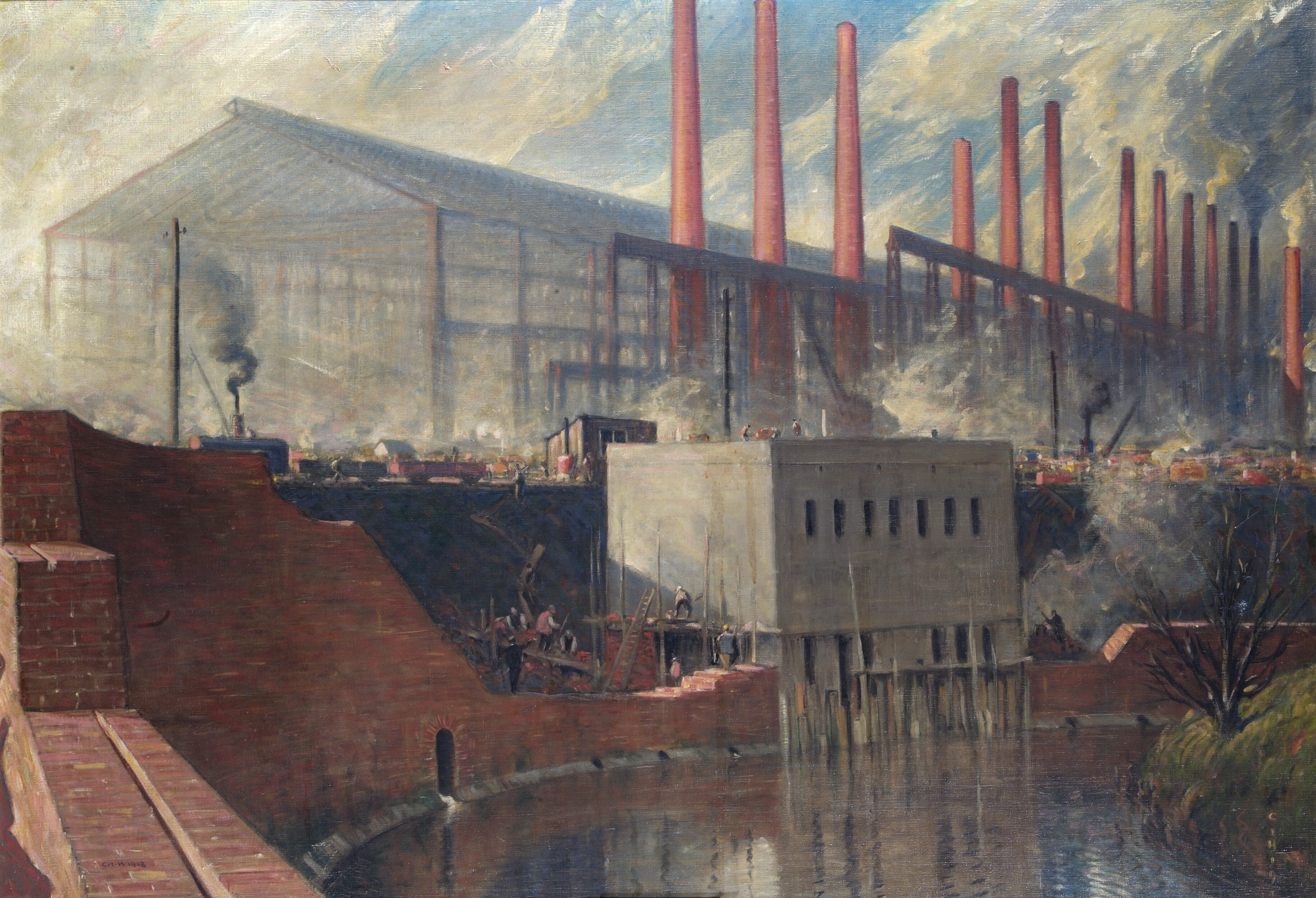
A Two Year-old Steel Works, 1918 by Charles John Holmes

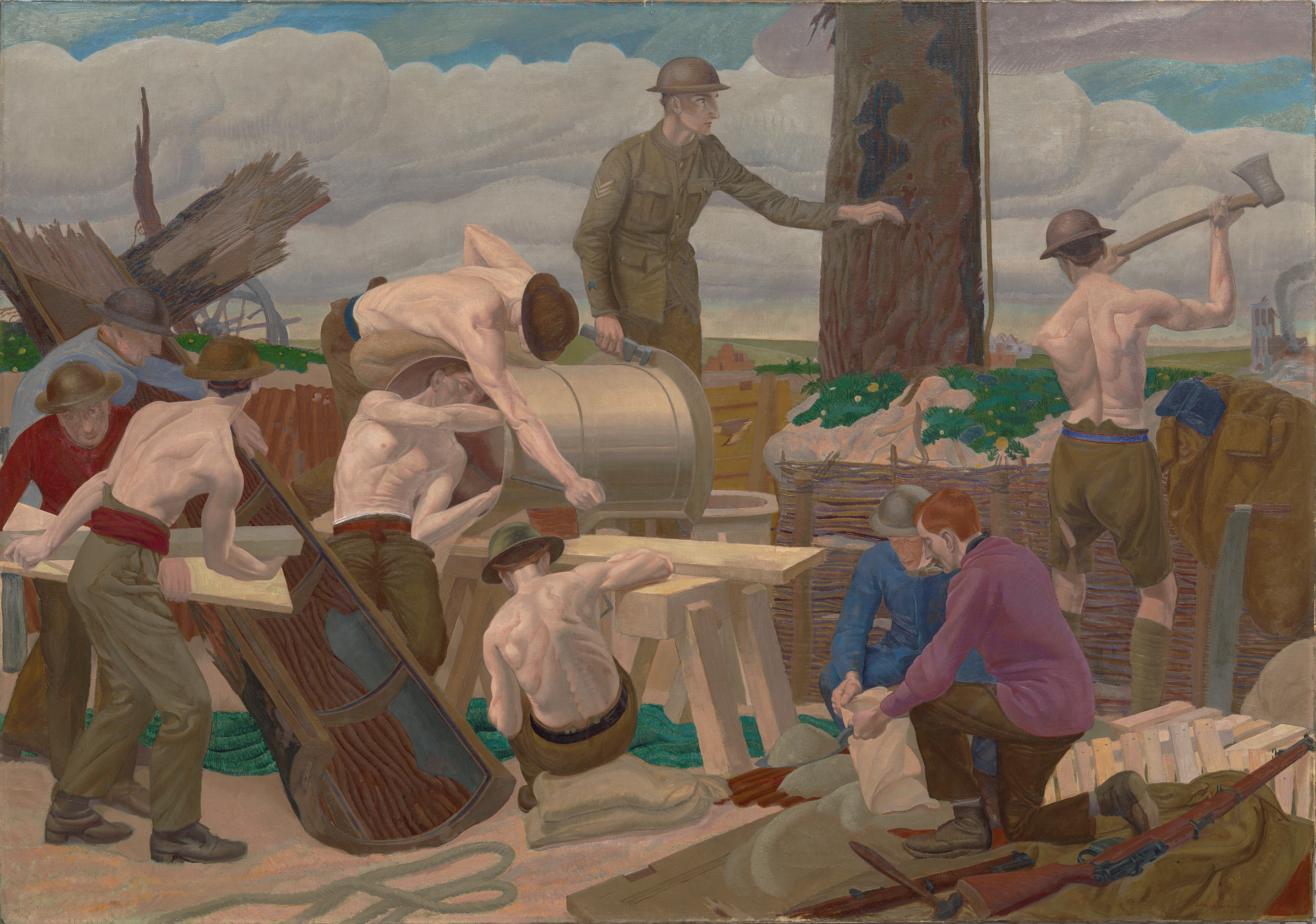
Erecting a Camouflage Tree (1919) by Leon Underwood

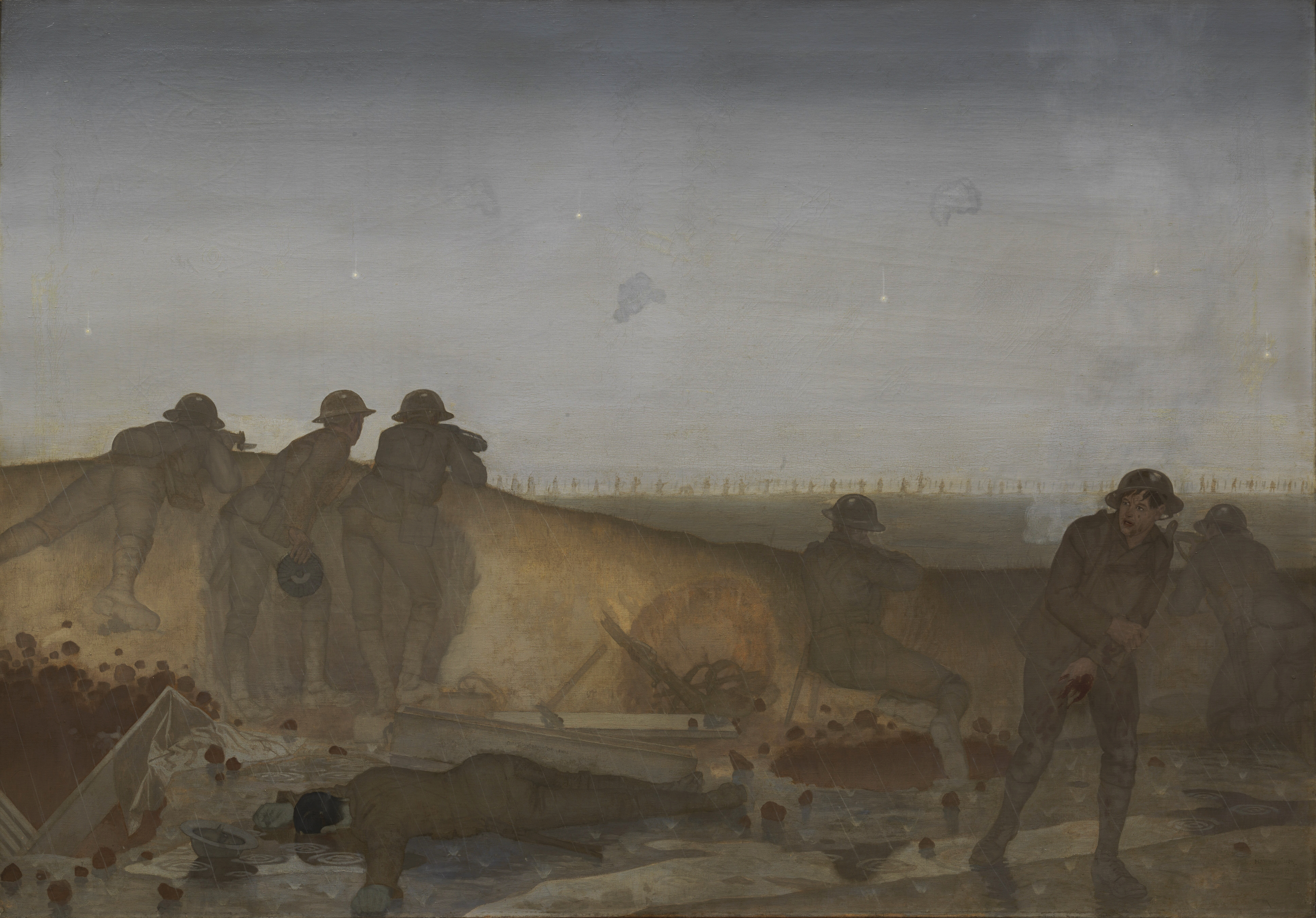
A German Attack on a Wet Morning, April 1918 (1918) Harold Sandys Williamson:
