= Darsie Japp =

British artist (1883–1973)

Darsie Napier Japp MC (17 February 1883 – 1973) was an English painter and soldier.

Regimental Band (1918) (Imperial War Museum)

Japp was born in Liverpool and attended St John's College of the University of Oxford. After he graduated, he worked in the offices of his father's shipping company in the City of London between 1904 and 1907. While working in the City, Japp studied at the night school of the Lambeth School of Art under Philip Connard. Japp studied at the Slade School of Art between 1908 and 1909, where he became friends with his fellow student Stanley Spencer and would often visit him in his home at Cookham in Berkshire. Japp specialised in landscape and figure paintings, and exhibited with the New English Art Club of which he became a member in 1919.

At the start of the First World War Japp joined the British Army, and eventually became a Major in the Royal Field Artillery commanding an artillery battery in Macedonia, for which he was awarded the Military Cross. Coincidentally, Spencer also served in Macedonia in the last years of the war and the British War Memorial Committee was keen for both men to be released from their military duties to work on paintings for the proposed, but never built, national Hall of Remembrance. The Army refused to release either of them until after the Armistice, when Japp, following a visit to the Western Front, began work on the painting The Royal Field Artillery in Macedonia, Spring 1918 (1919), which is now part of the collection of the Imperial War Museum.

Shortly after the war, Japp gave up painting professionally to farm and to breed race horses in Berkshire. Henry Lamb painted a group portrait of Japp and his family in 1928, which is now in Manchester Art Gallery. Japp left England in 1926, and for the next 27 years lived in France and Spain, before returning to England in 1953. He left England again to live in Portugal some years later.
