= David Young Cameron =

Scottish painter and etcher (1865–1945)

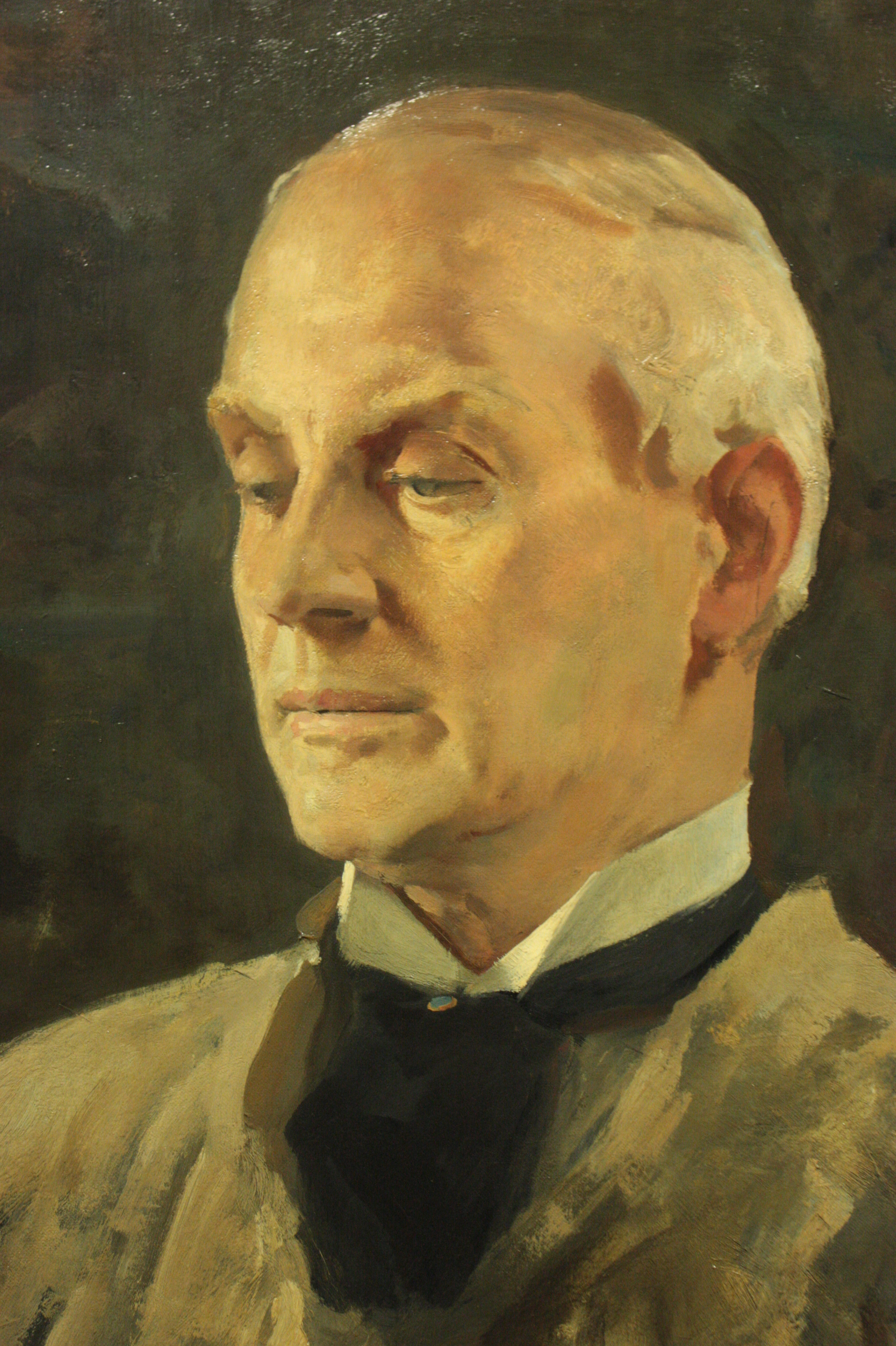
- David Young Cameron by Alfred Kingsley Lawrence c.1920
- Born: 28 June 1865; Glasgow, Scotland
- Died: 16 September 1945 (aged 80); Perth, Scotland
- Known for: landscape painting, etching
- Relatives: Katharine Cameron (sister)

Sir David Young Cameron RA (28 June 1865 – 16 September 1945) was a Scottish painter and, with greater success, etcher, mostly of townscapes and landscapes in both cases. He was a leading figure in the final decades of the Etching Revival.

== Biography ==
Cameron was the son of the Rev. Robert Cameron of the United Presbyterian Church, and his wife Margaret Robertson, and was born in Glasgow, Scotland. One of five children, his sister Katharine (Kate) Cameron (1874–1965) was also an artist and sometimes included in the "Glasgow Girls".(

David was educated at The Glasgow Academy. From around 1881 he studied at the Glasgow School of Art and in 1885 enrolled at the Edinburgh School of Art. Cameron became a skilled etcher and gained international recognition by the 1890s. He was elected associate of the Royal Society of Painter-Etchers (RE) in 1889. In 1895 he was elected Fellow of the RE. He exhibited regularly from 1889 to 1902, before resigning his membership in 1903.

Cameron's subjects included architectural studies, of which he produced a number of popular 'sets' and landscapes. He received various medals and awards for his etchings. He published a number of sets of etchings, including "The Clyde Set", "The North Holland Set" and "The North Italian Set". In general his prints feature areas of great darkness, offset by highlights. Cameron would later become known for his church interiors and barren landscapes of Scotland done in drypoint. The feathery lightness of these drypoints was in visual contrast with the rock and water of the subjects. He became highly sought after by collectors, until the Great Crash of 1929 brought a collapse in prices for prints in general. He exploited his popularity by producing an unprecedented number of states of his prints, and is believed to hold the record at twenty-eight states in one case.

As well as becoming well known as an etcher, Cameron also produced a great many oil paintings and watercolour sketches of landscapes and architectural subjects. His earliest known oil painting dates to 1883. His work was influenced by the Glasgow Boys and the Hague School. His first exhibition of 14 paintings received mixed reviews. Amongst the many good reviews others described his work as lacking in subtlety and substance with too much concentration on decoration. This was due in part to his romanticising of his subjects. From 1900 he stopped exhibiting portraits and figure studies, concentrating solely on landscapes and architectural subjects in both his painting and etching.

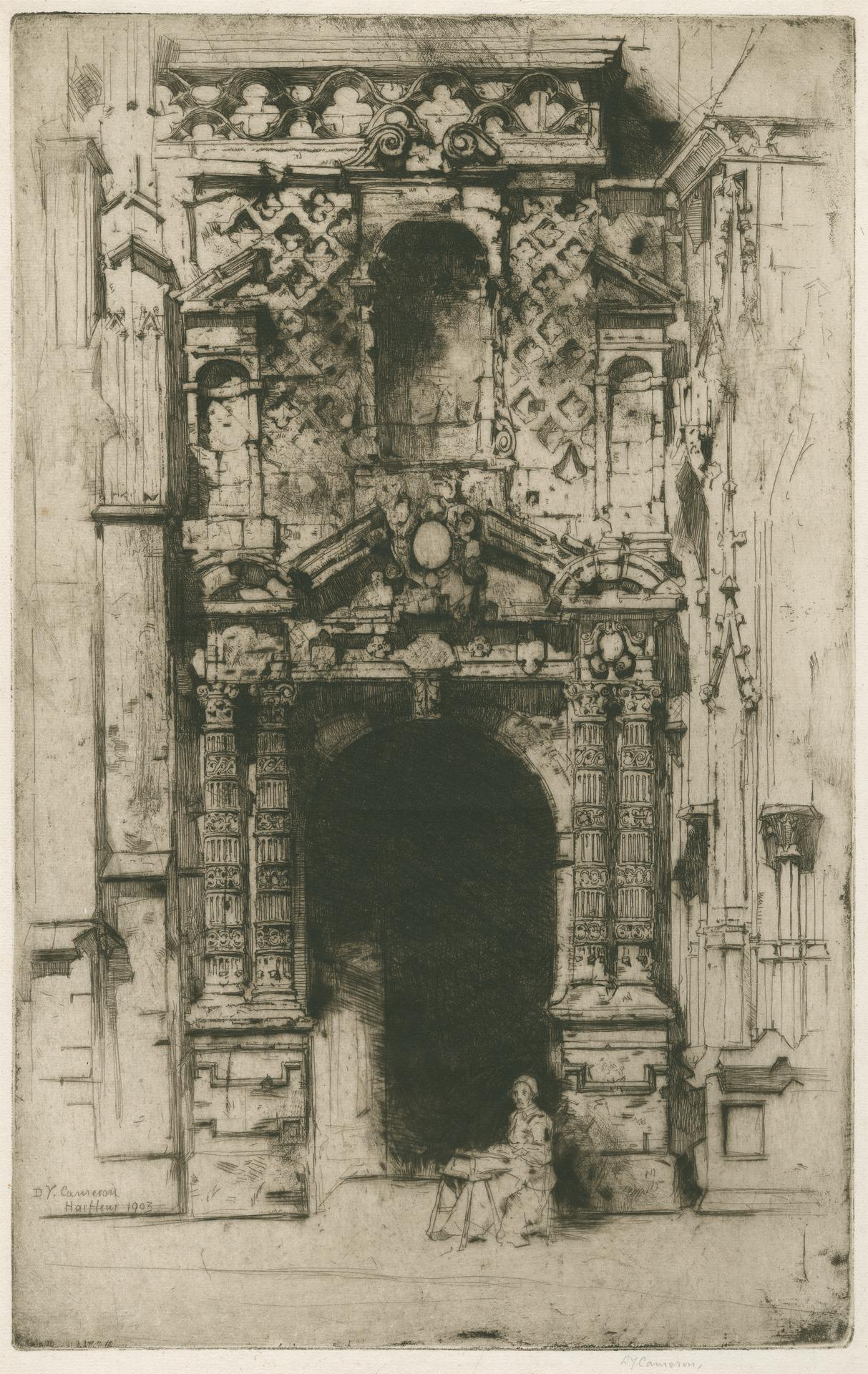
Harfleur, etching and drypoint, 1903

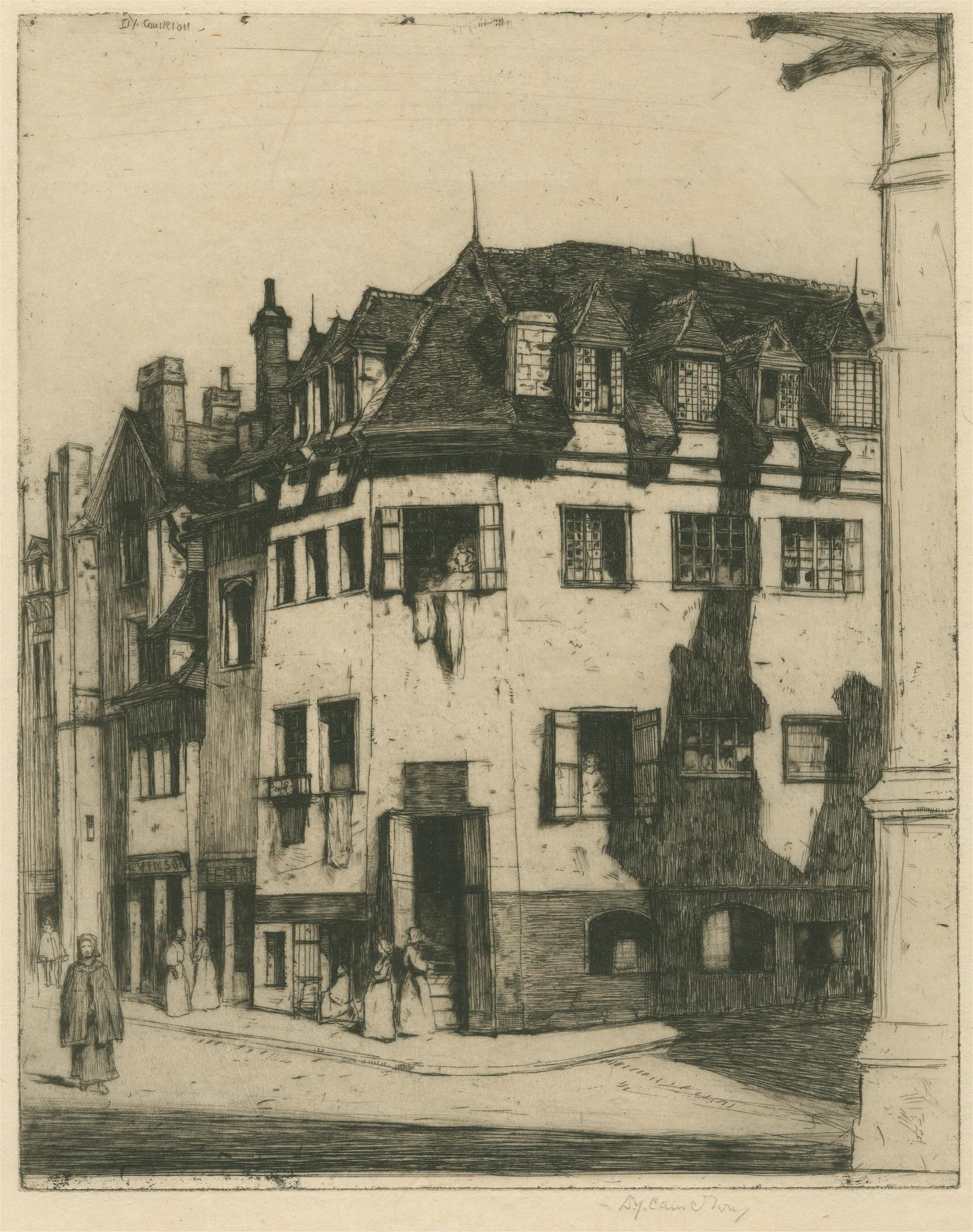
Beauvais, drypoint, 1910

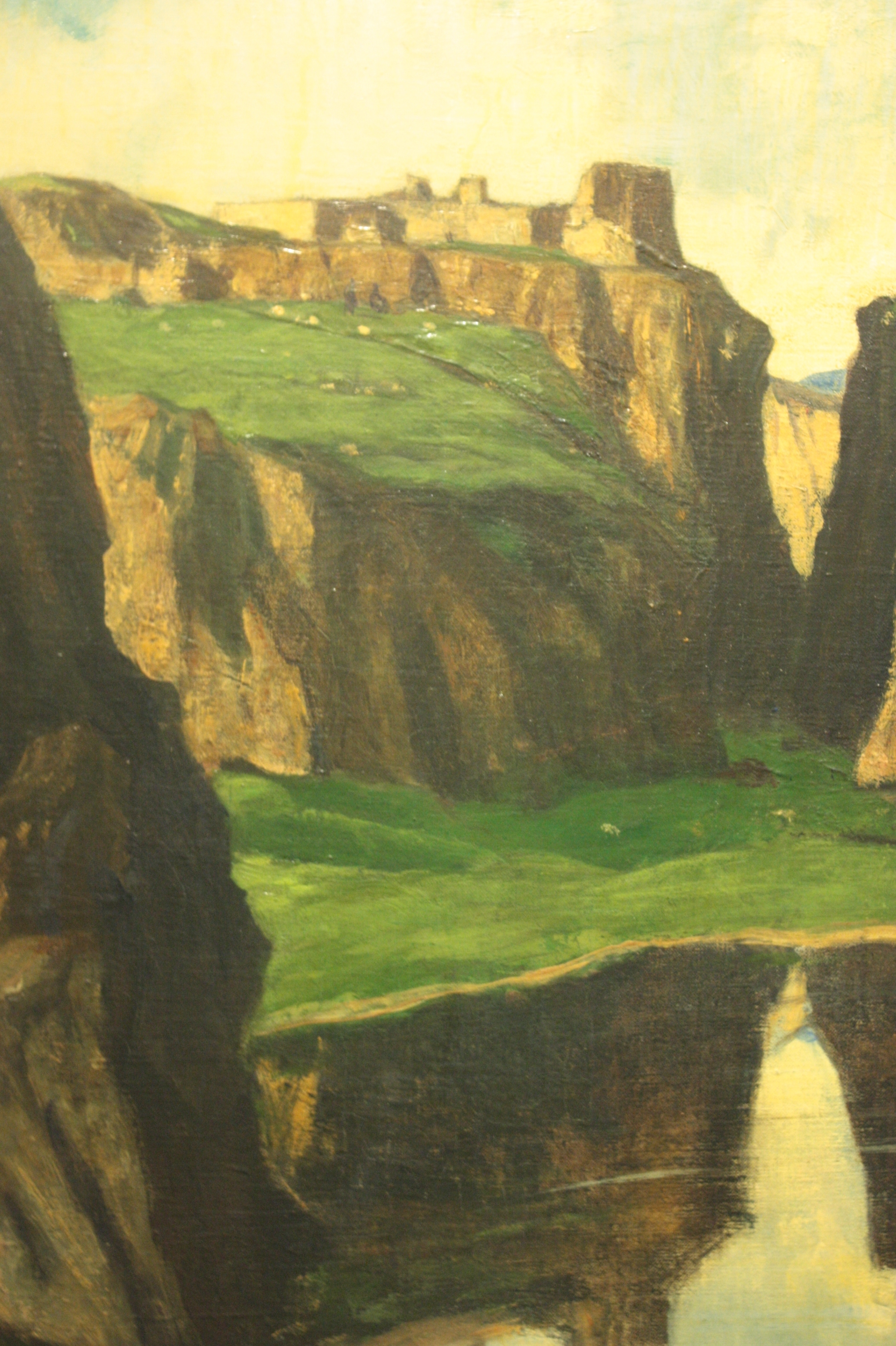
Rocks and Ruins, 1913

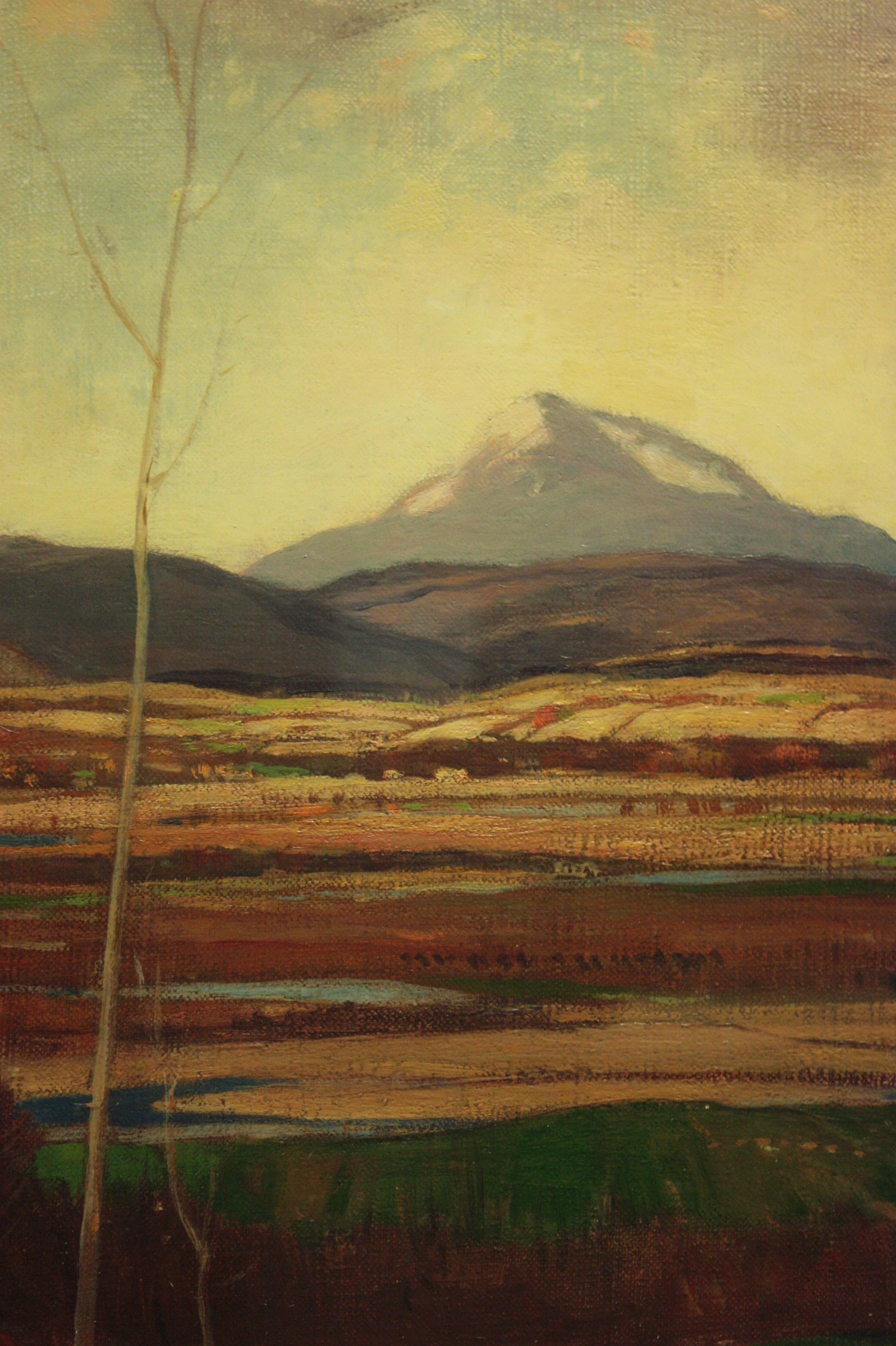
Ben Ledi

In 1899 Cameron and his wife moved to Kippen. This was near to Stirling with views of Ben Lomond and across to Stirling Castle. They lived in the village for rest of their lives, as well as keeping a house in London. They also made regular trips abroad including visits throughout Italy and France. Italy provided the inspiration for a number of etchings of architectural subjects, with church interiors proving successful. His etchings, which examined light and shade, again show the influence of the Hague School as well as Whistler and Rembrandt.

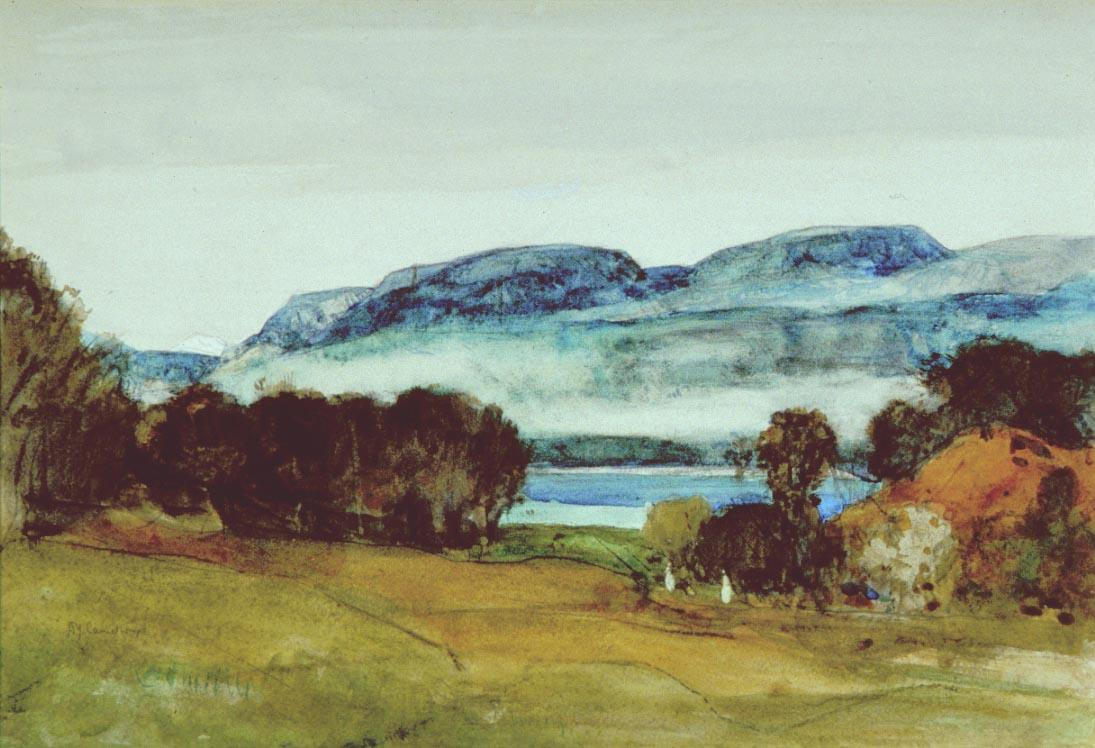
Menteith

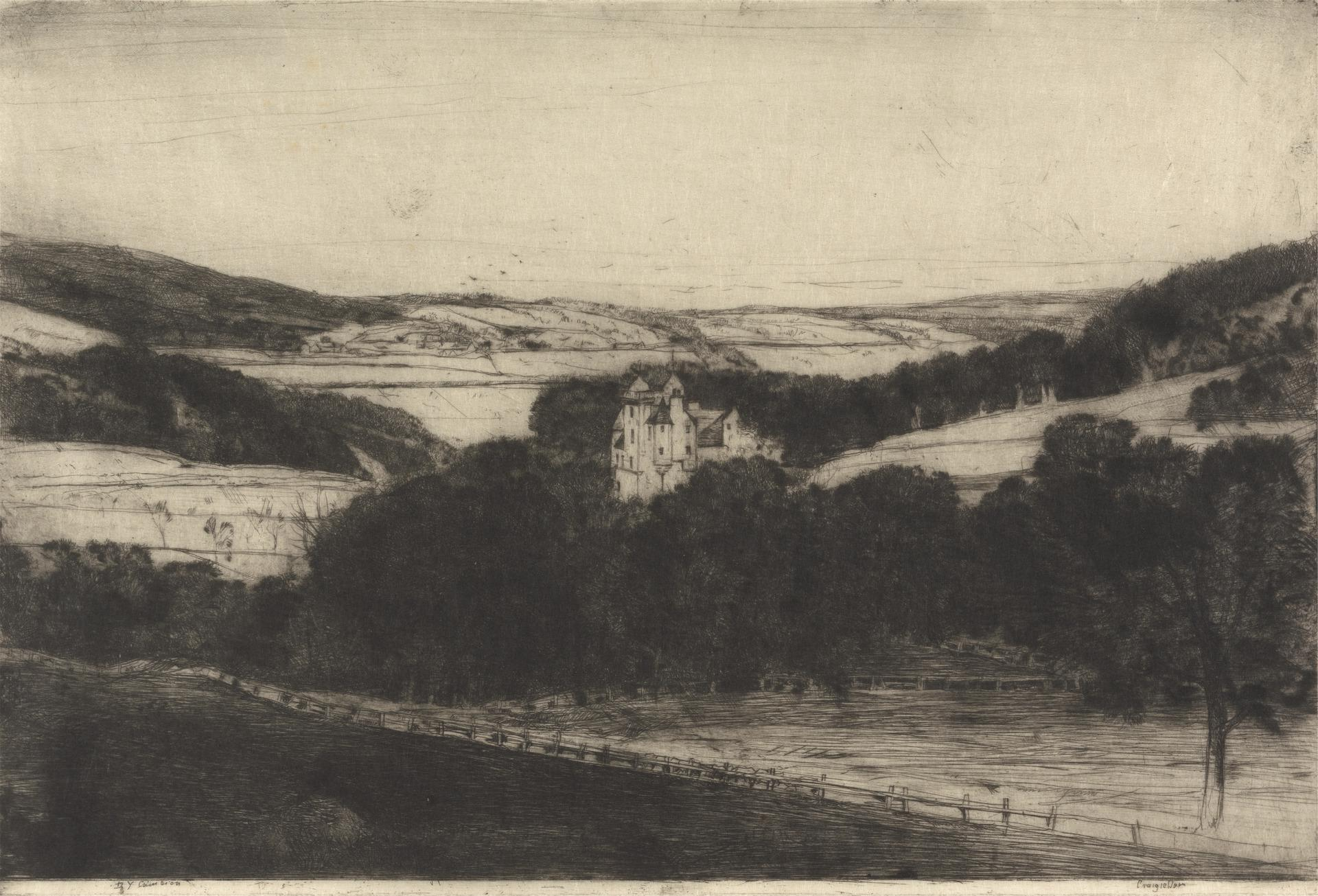
Craigievar Castle, drypoint, 1908

In 1901 Cameron became a member of the anti-Royal Academy society the International Society of Sculptors, Painters and Gravers, (later The International) that had been founded by Whistler in 1898. He exhibited with the society from 1898 and later served on its council. Following his resignation from the RE, Cameron and 11 other artists formed The Society of Twelve in 1904 with the objective to promote the original print. He became a member of the Royal Society of Painters in Watercolours in 1906. He was elected Associate of the Royal Scottish Academy (RsA) in 1904 (on his 6th attempt) and became RsA in 1918. Having previously been elected Associate of the Royal Academy (ARA) in the engraver class in 1911, in 1916 he was also elected ARA for his painting. He was elected a full Royal Academician (RA) in 1920. During these years Cameron's work was also exhibited at the Royal Society of Oil Painters, the Royal Glasgow Institute, the Walker Art Gallery, Liverpool, as well as showing in overseas exhibitions.

After 1907 Cameron's work showed a greater focus on Scottish landscape subjects and from 1908 to 1917 he moved from etching to painting. Around this time he largely stopped including figures in his compositions, apart from in his architectural studies. By this time his works were receiving wide critical acclaim and he was well known both in the UK and abroad. Around 1908 his work began to lighten in colour, prior to this Cameron's work had been criticised for being too dark with a heavy use of brown tones. Visits to France and Italy in the 1920s seemed to have a further influence on his works and brought about a much brighter palette. His painting can be characterised by an interest in tone and design over colour and detail. At the same time there was a shift in influence away from the Glasgow Boys and their decorative style and he became known for his atmospheric highland landscapes.

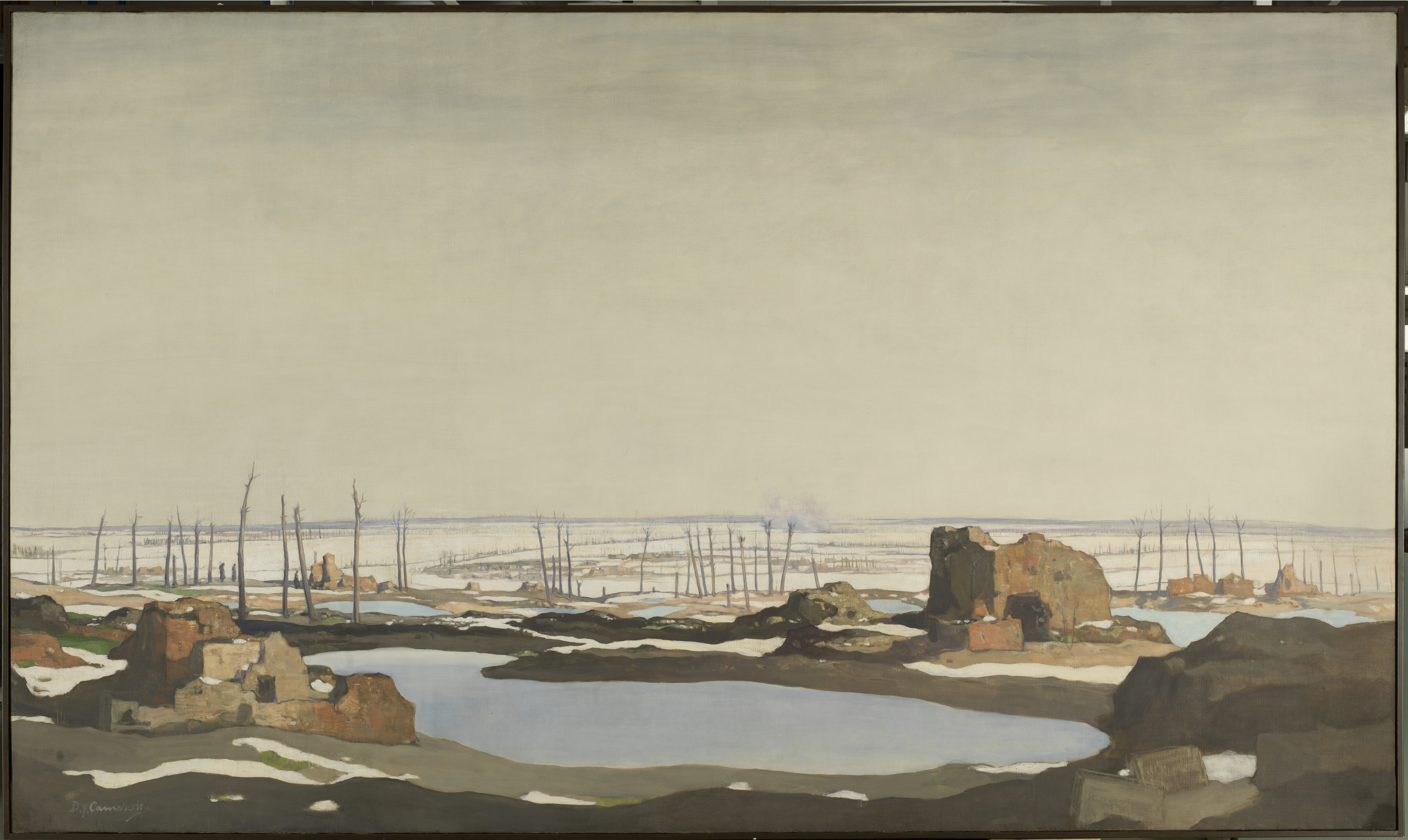
The Battlefields of Ypres—After (1920) commissioned for the Hall of Remembrance, a commemoration of the dead of World War One.

Cameron was well known and liked in the art world and held a great many appointments to societies and boards. On the retirement of RsA president Sir James Guthrie in 1919, it was suggested that Cameron stand for the presidency. Cameron declined however, citing too many existing responsibilities in London.

In 1917–18 Cameron was commissioned by the Canadian Government to paint the war in France. Cameron was knighted in the 1924 Birthday Honours and was a Trustee of the Tate Gallery from 1921 to 1927 and the Scottish National Gallery, and was the King's Painter and Limner in Scotland from 1933. In 1914 he was sculpted by Percy Portsmouth ARSA.

Cameron died in Perth, Scotland on 16 September 1945.
