= Colin Gill =

English painter (1892-1940)

- Born: 12 May 1892; Bexleyheath, Kent
- Died: 16 November 1940 (aged 48); South Africa
- Education: Slade School of Art
- Known for: Painting, drawing

Colin Unwin Gill (12 May 1892 – 16 November 1940) was an English artist who painted murals and portraits and is most notable for the work he produced as a war artist during the First World War.

== Biography ==
=== Early life ===
Colin Gill was born at Bexleyheath in Kent. Marjory Allen, Baroness Allen of Hurtwood, was his younger sister and fellow artist Eric Gill was their cousin. He studied at the Slade School of Art, and in 1913 became the first recipient of the Rome Scholarship in Decorative Painting to the British School at Rome.

=== First World War ===
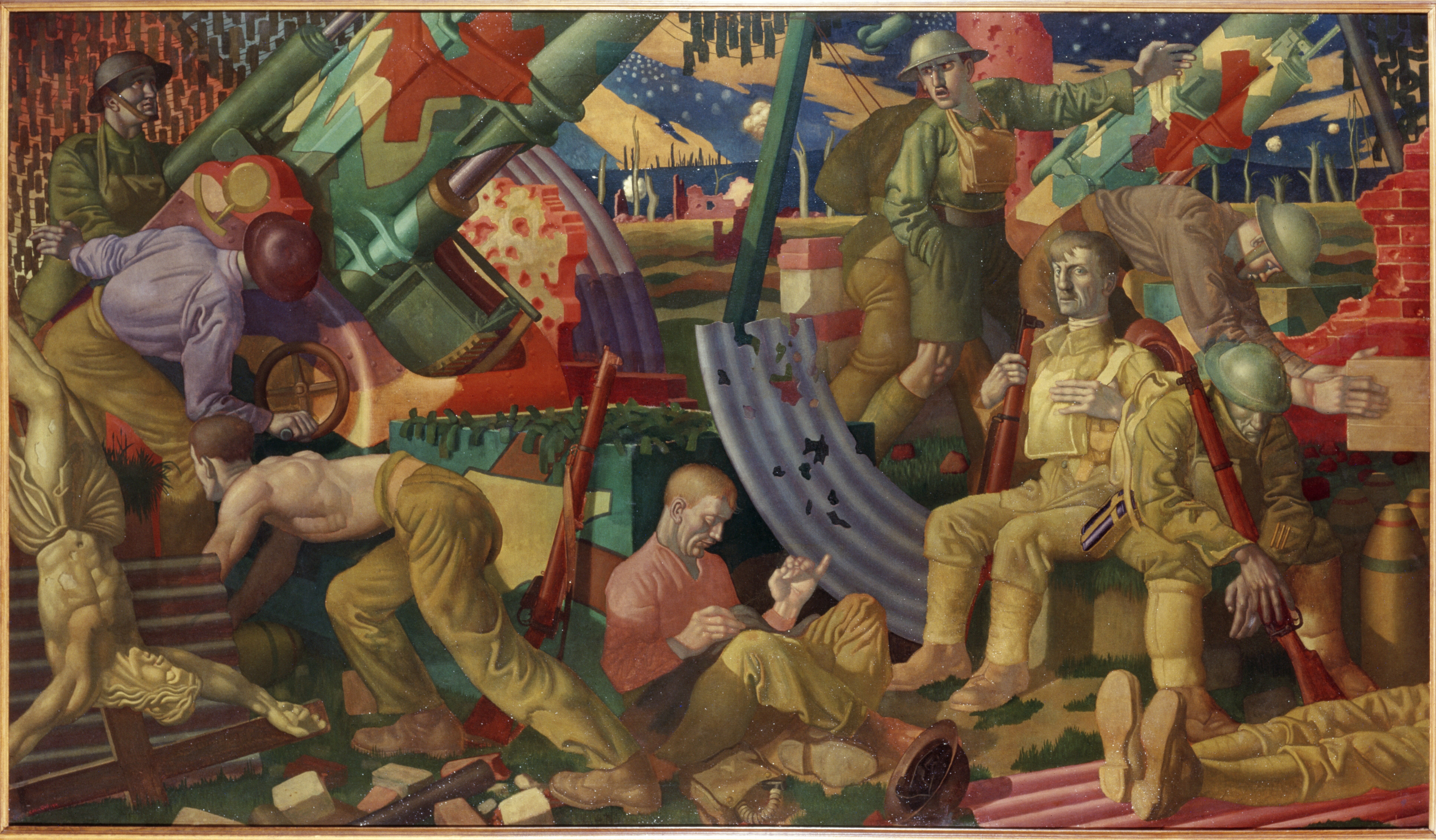
Heavy Artillery (Art.IWM ART 2274)

At the start of World War I, Gill joined the Royal Garrison Artillery and served with them on the Western Front as a second lieutenant with the 17th Heavy Battery until 1916, when he was seconded to the Royal Engineers to work as a front-line camouflage officer. He was invalided back to England, with gas poisoning in March 1918, and spent several months recovering at the Hospital for Officers on the Isle of Wight.

In May 1918, Gill offered his services as a war artist but, initially was turned down and continued to work as a camouflage instructor. Later, the British War Memorials Committee did commission Gill to produce a large work for the proposed, but never built Hall of Remembrance. For this, he was released from his duties at the Camouflage School and returned to France on 7 November 1918 to do sketches, and other work, for his BWMC commission. He stayed in France until 14 December 1918, visiting Mons only hours after it had been retaken by the Allies. At the front, Gill spent a week stationed in an artillery battery, where he suffered from frostbite. The visit to France resulted in the paintings Evening, After a Push and Heavy Artillery, the painting intended for the Hall of Remembrance and, later, Canadian Observation Post for the Canadian War Memorials scheme. For Heavy Artillery, Gill drew on his experience as a camouflage officer; the two large howitzers in the painting both have a patchwork camouflage design and are covered in green netting to avoid detection by enemy aircraft.

=== Later life ===
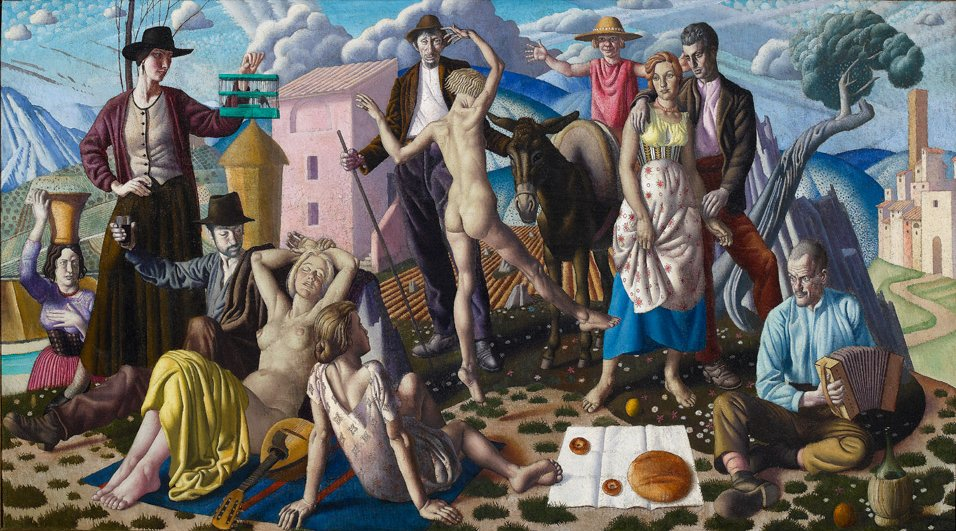
Allegro (1921), oil on canvas, 46 x 90 inches

By 1919, Gill had returned to the British School in Rome.

Gill first exhibited with New English Art Club in 1914 and eventually became a member of the group in 1926. He also showed works at the Royal Academy from 1924 onwards and taught painting at the Royal College of Art from 1922 until 1925. Between 1925 and 1927, Gill worked on a large mural, King Alfred's long-ships defeat the Danes, 877, for St. Stephen's Hall in the Palace of Westminster. This was followed by mural commissions for the Bank of England, Essex County Hall in Chelmsford and Northampton Guildhall.

In the early thirties, Gill had an affair with Mabel Lethbridge, a Great War heroine and writer, while occupying a studio on the first floor of her Chelsea home. Her daughter Sue was the child model for Gill's 1934 painting The Kerry Flute Player In 1938, under the name Richard Saxby, Gill with his wife Una Long published the book Five Came to London. In 1939, he received a commission to paint murals at the Johannesburg Magistrates' Courts and it was in South Africa, in November 1940, that he died, aged 48, of an illness.
