= Harold Sandys Williamson =

English artist (1892–1978)

- Born: 29 August 1892; Leeds, England
- Died: 6 March 1978 (aged 85); Norwich, Norfolk, England
- Education: Leeds School of Art; Royal Academy schools
- Known for: Painting

Harold Sandys Williamson (29 August 1892 – 6 March 1978) was a British painter, poster designer and teacher. Williamson fought on the Western Front in the First World War and also worked as a war artist, both later in that conflict and, on the Home Front, in the Second World War.

== Biography ==
Williamson was born in Leeds and attended the Leeds School of Art from 1911 to 1914, when he moved to London to study at the Royal Academy schools. During the year he was at the academy school he was awarded the Turner Gold Medal.

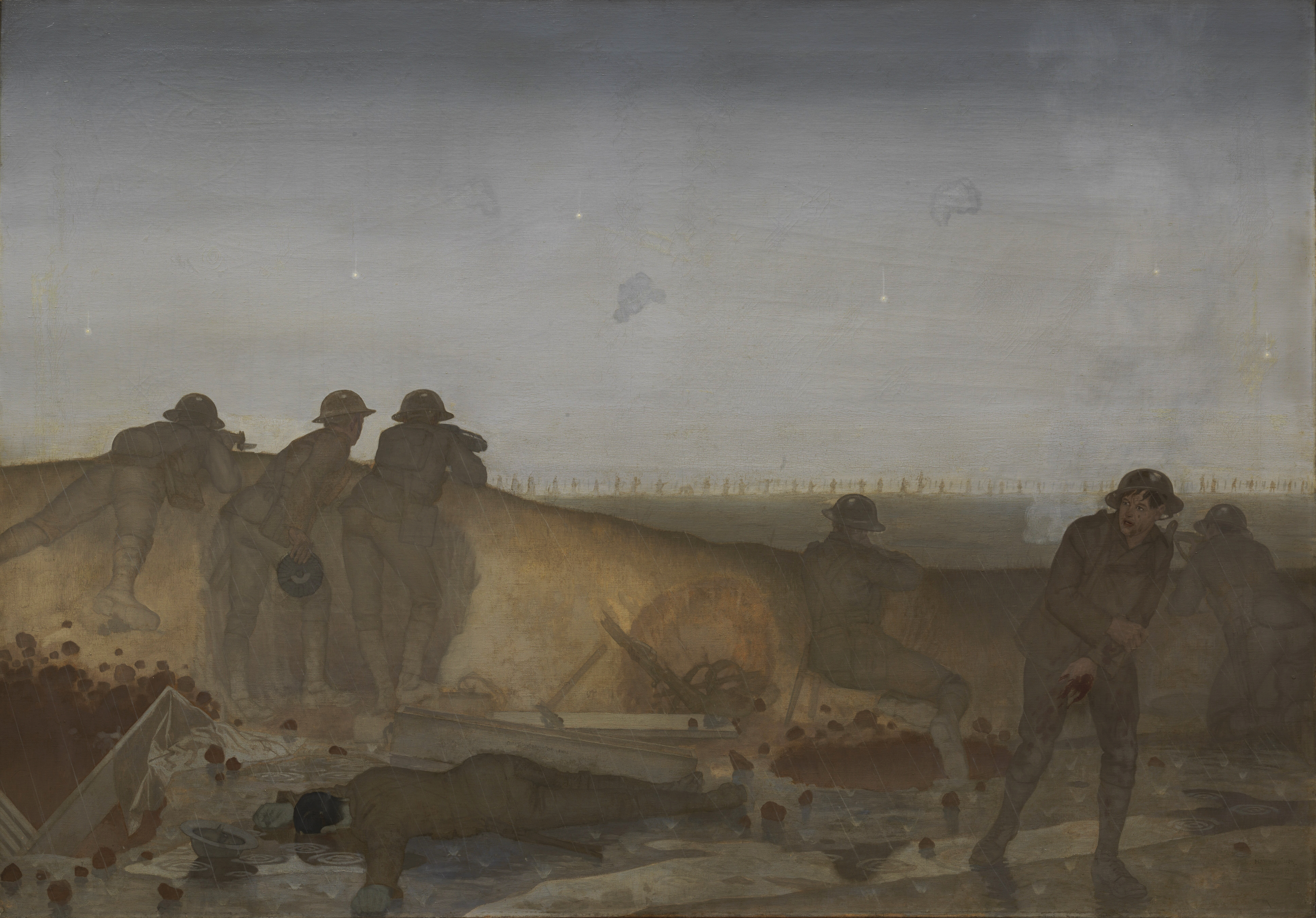
A German Attack on a Wet Morning, April 1918 Art.IWMART1986

At the start of the First World War, Williamson sought to enlist in the British Army and was, at his second attempt, accepted as a private in the King's Royal Rifle Corps in January 1916. Williamson was injured at least twice during the fighting on the Western Front in France. The first occasion was during the Battle of Delville Wood in September 1916, when he was hit by a grenade fragment. Whilst recovering from a subsequent infection, he undertook orderly work in the operating theatre at No. 6 General Hospital in France and made a number of paintings based his experiences there. Williamson was also injured in April 1918 in the Villers-Bretonneux sector, when the sunken road his unit was defending was overrun by German forces. This action became the subject of his painting A German Attack on a Wet Morning, April 1918, which he completed in the spring of 1919. The painting was shown at the Royal Academy in 1919 to some public acclaim and was purchased by the British War Memorials Committee. Although Williamson wrote an extensive set of notes to accompany the painting, he left it to others to point out that the figure in the work facing the viewer with an injured hand was a self-portrait.

After the war, Williamson established himself as a commercial artist. He designed posters for the London Underground and London Transport between 1922 and 1939 and also for the Empire Marketing Board, the GPO and the Council for the Encouragement of Music and the Arts. In 1930 he was appointed head of the Chelsea School of Art, a post he held until 1958. During his tenure there he recruited Henry Moore to lead a new department of sculpture at the college. Other artists employed by Williamson as teachers included Graham Sutherland, Ceri Richards and Claude Rogers. Williamson was elected to the London Group in 1933 and, from 1937 to 1943, he served as the Group's chairman. He also exhibited on a regular basis with the New English Art Club and at the Royal Academy. In the Second World War, Williamson completed a number of short-term commissions for the War Artists' Advisory Committee on the work of the Post Office in the London Blitz.
