= Dorothy Coke =

English artist (1897–1979)

- Born: 11 April 1897; Southend-on-Sea, Essex, England
- Died: 1979 (aged 81–82); Brighton, Sussex, England
- Education: Slade School of Fine Art
- Known for: Painting

Dorothy Josephine Coke (11 April 1897 – 1979) was an English artist notable for her work as a war artist on the British home front during the Second World War. Coke was also an art teacher and as an artist was known for her watercolours, which have a very free, open-air quality to them.

== Life and work ==
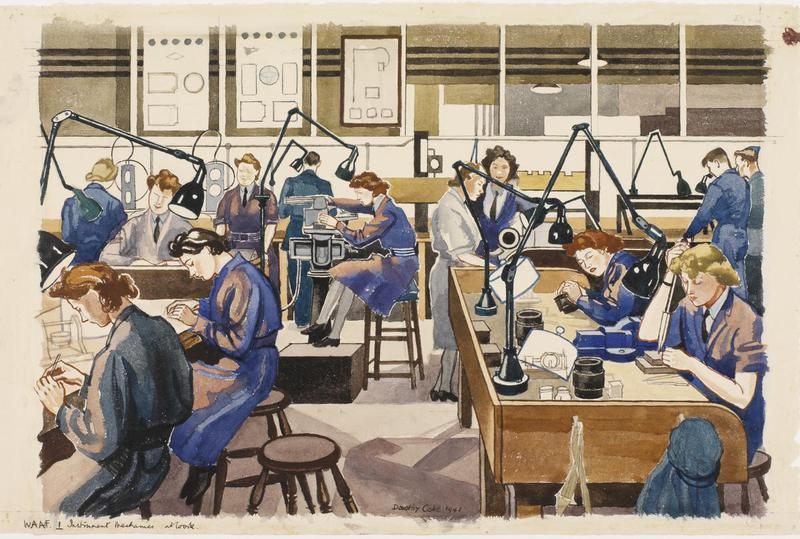
WAAF Instrument Mechanics at Work (1941) (ArtIWM.ART LD 1298)

Coke was born in Southend-on-Sea in Essex in 1897, where her father was a tea exporter. When she was seventeen, Coke entered the Slade School of Art, where she continued to study throughout the First World War and where she won a prize for figure composition. In the summer of 1918 Coke submitted some sketches to the British War Memorials Committee for a possible commission. That proposal was rejected but shortly afterwards Muirhead Bone bought two of her watercolours for the Imperial War Museum collection. In 1919 she was elected a member of the New English Art Club.

By the start of World War Two Coke was a popular and well known artist. During the War she received a short-term commission from the War Artists Advisory Committee to depict the work being performed by women in various services. To this end she spent time with the Women's Voluntary Service, the Auxiliary Territorial Service, the Women's Auxiliary Air Force and also with the Red Cross. One of her paintings was included in the Britain at War exhibition at the Museum of Modern Art in New York which opened in May 1941. By the end of the War, WAAC had acquired eight paintings from Coke. During the War, in 1943, she was elected a member of the Royal Watercolour Society, having previously become an Associate member in 1935.

After the War, Coke taught art at Brighton College of Art until her retirement in 1967.
