= The Menin Road (painting) =

1919 painting by Paul Nash

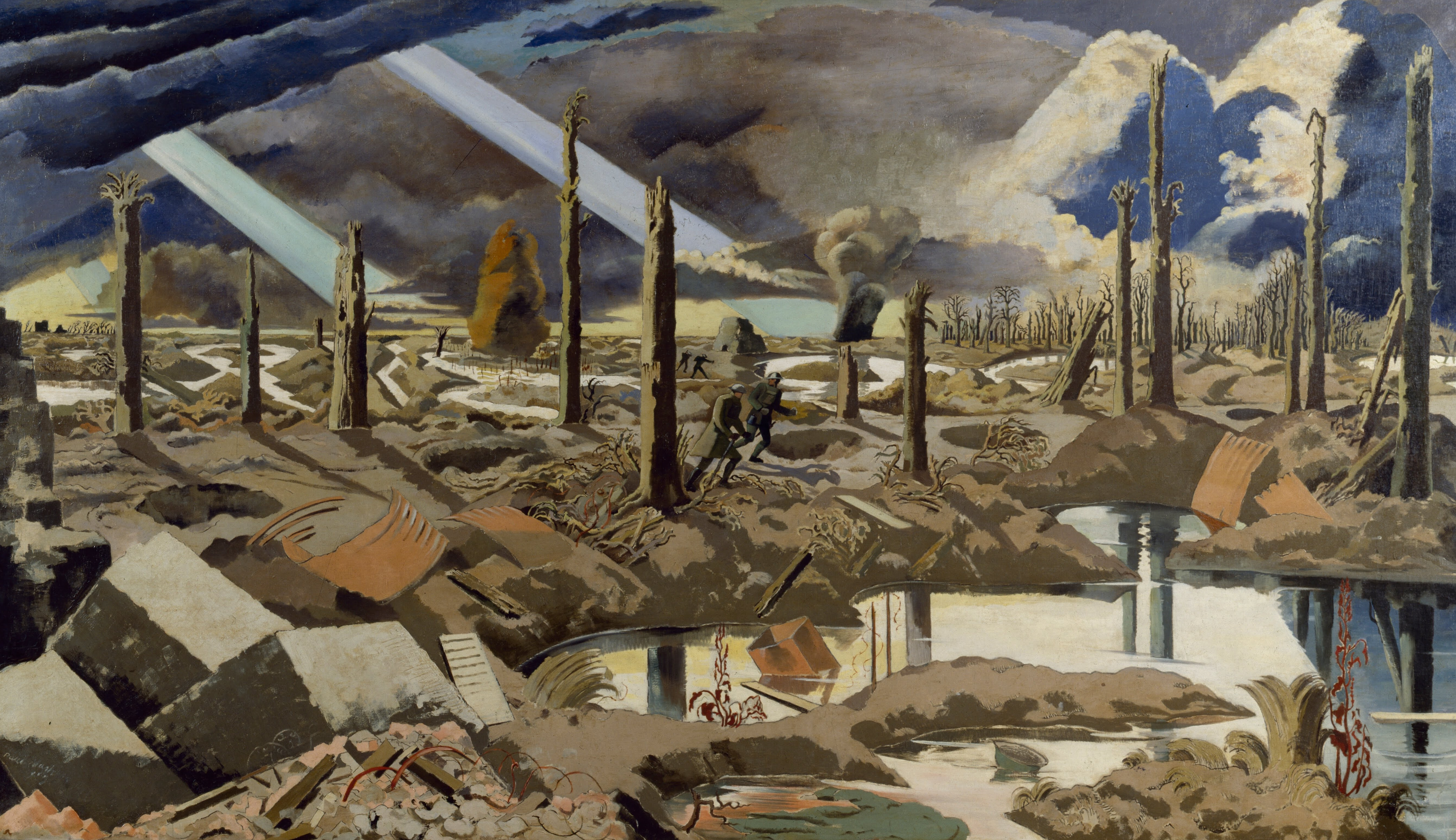
- Artist: Paul Nash
- Year: 1918
- Medium: Oil on canvas
- Dimensions: 182.8 cm × 317.5 cm (72 in × 125 in)
- Location: Imperial War Museum, London
- Website: Imperial War Museum

The Menin Road is a large oil painting by Paul Nash completed in 1919 that depicts a First World War battlefield. Nash was commissioned by the British War Memorials Committee to paint a battlefield scene for the proposed national Hall of Remembrance. The painting is considered one of the most iconic images of the First World War and is held by the Imperial War Museum.

== Background ==
In September 1914, the British government set up a propaganda department at Wellington House to influence domestic and overseas opinion. In 1916 Wellington House established a section to distribute films and publications such as War Pictorial and argued for practising artists to be sent to the Western Front. In 1916, Max Aitken had established the Canadian War Records Office (CWRO) aiming to create an artistic and photographic record of the activities of Canadian forces. In February 1918, Aitken was made head of the new British Ministry of Information (MoI) and subsequently established the British War Memorials Committee (BWMC). The BWMC began recruiting artists to compile a record of the war in France and at home. Paul Nash had spent the spring of 1917 in the Ypres Salient and returned there as an official artist in November that year. Along with Christopher Nevinson, Nash made a special study of the experience of the Third Battle of Ypres.

== Commission ==
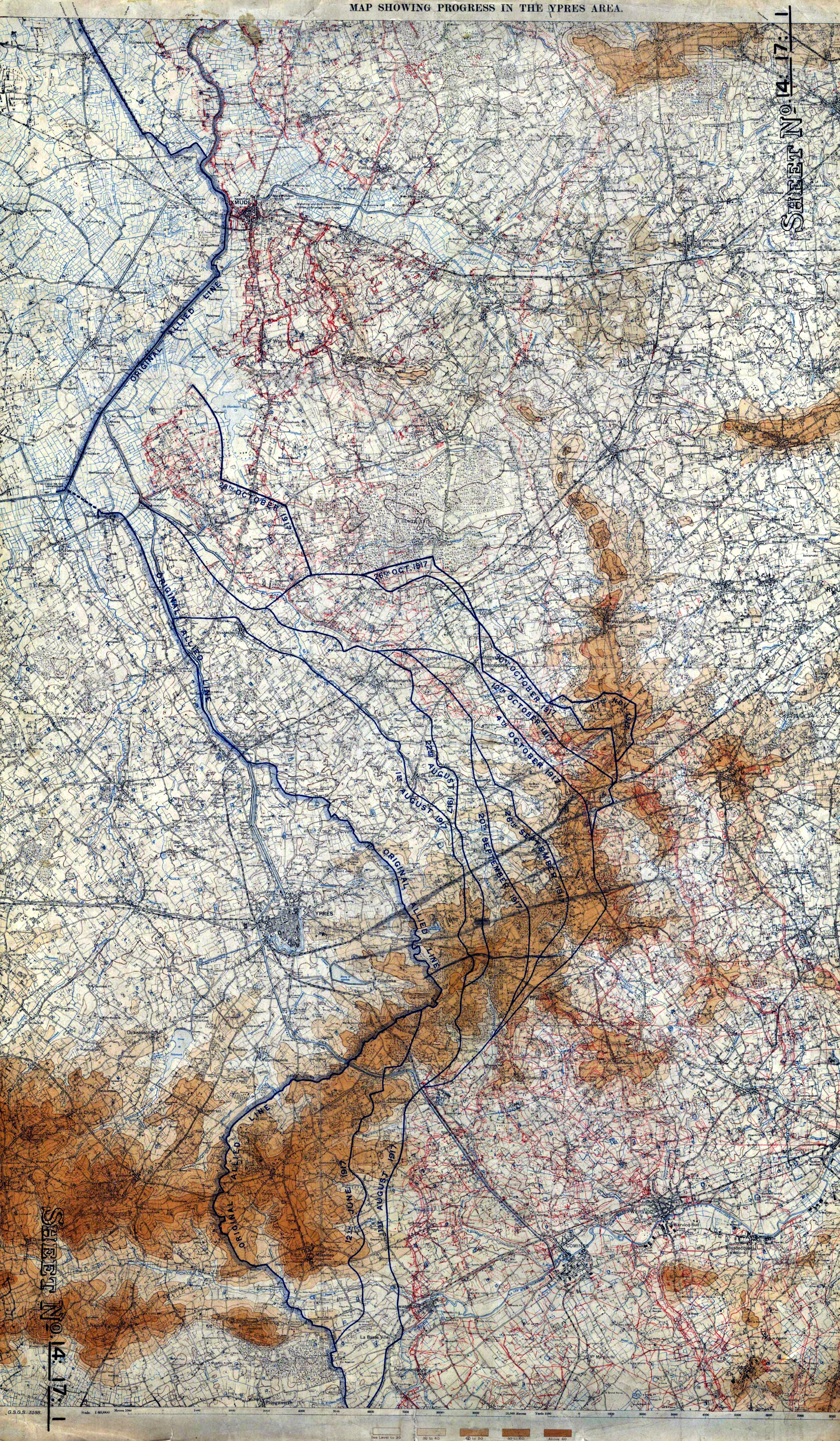
Third Ypres - Map Showing Progress in the Ypres Area. In the expanded view, the Bassevillebeek Spur can be seen to the west of Gheluvelt

In April 1918, Nash was commissioned by the British War Memorials Committee to paint a battlefield scene, for the proposed, national Hall of Remembrance, which was never built. He decided to depict a section of the Ypres Salient, that had been devastated during the Battle of the Menin Road Ridge, at the top of the Bassevillebeek Spur, where the British called a cluster of German pill boxes Tower Hamlets. Nash originally intended to call the painting A Flanders Battlefield but eventually chose The Menin Road. The road, now the N8, was the main road from Ypres to Menin, passing Sanctuary Wood, Hooge Crater, Inverness Copse and Hellfire Corner.

Nash knew the area well from the spring of 1917, when he served in the British Expeditionary Force (BEF) on the Western Front and from later that year, when he returned to the war zone as an official war artist. From late October to November 1917, Nash made about fifty drawings of the front, visiting Hill 60, Gheluvelt, Inverness Copse, Zillebeke and Sanctuary Wood. Nash had come under shellfire when travelling along the route and had the quick reactions of his driver to thank for his survival. He considered Tower Hamlets to be "perhaps the most dreaded and disastrous locality of any area in any of the theatres of War".

== Description ==
Nash started painting the huge canvas, which was almost 60 sq ft (5.6 m^{2}), at Tubbs Farm near Chalfont St Peter in Buckinghamshire, using a herb drying shed as a studio in June 1918. He shared the space with his brother, John Nash, who was working on Over the Top. When they had to leave the shed, Paul Nash struggled to find somewhere to work on his painting but eventually, after using two other locations, completed The Menin Road in a room in Gower Street, London in February 1919. The room was so small that to view the canvas in full, Nash had to climb out the window.

The Menin Road depicts a landscape of flooded shell craters and trenches while tree stumps, devoid of any foliage, point towards a sky full of clouds and plumes of smoke, bisected by shafts of sunlight resembling gun barrels. Two soldiers at the centre of the picture attempt to follow the, almost, unrecognisable road but appear to be trapped by the landscape. Nash composed the picture in three broad horizontal strips. The foreground is filled with shell craters and debris, which block access to the road in the middle of the picture. The only possible path, to the side of one of the mud pools, is blocked by a fallen board. Across the centre of the picture, shell holes punch into the road at regular intervals, while debris further breaks up the road, as do the shadows from a line of trees alongside it. Beyond the trees, the battlefield stretches to the horizon, with a wood of stunted trees on the right hand side and to the left a series of seven zigzag streams, that also fail to reach the horizon and escape. Nash came to consider this painting to be his finest work.

== Analysis ==
In 1997, the art historian Paul Gough wrote that The Menin Road had captured the inspiration and revulsion of the area. Nash had combined graphic ability with sophisticated design, spreading the composition all over the canvas, creating an anti-hierarchy, where the corners and anonymous spaces contain some of the most important and hideous images in the narrative. Modernist spatial distortion merged with a colour scheme echoing Flemish tapestry, showing the anachronisms of that "phantasmagoric land", in what Wyndham Lewis called "an epic of mud".

== See also ==
- Battle of Pilckem Ridge
