= Gassed (painting) =

Painting by John Singer Sargent

- Artist: John Singer Sargent
- Year: c. March 1919
- Type: Oil on canvas
- Dimensions: 2.31 m × 6.11 m (7.6 ft × 20.0 ft)
- Location: Imperial War Museum, London

Gassed is a very large oil painting completed in March 1919 by American expatriate artist John Singer Sargent. It depicts the aftermath of a mustard gas attack during the First World War, with a line of wounded, blinded soldiers being led to a dressing station. Commissioned by the British War Memorials Committee to document the war, Sargent visited the Western Front in July 1918, spending time with the Guards Division near Arras and the American Expeditionary Forces near Ypres. The painting was voted picture of the year at the Royal Academy's Summer Exhibition in 1919. Now held by the Imperial War Museum in London, the artwork underwent a major restoration in 2023 that significantly altered its appearance.

== Details ==
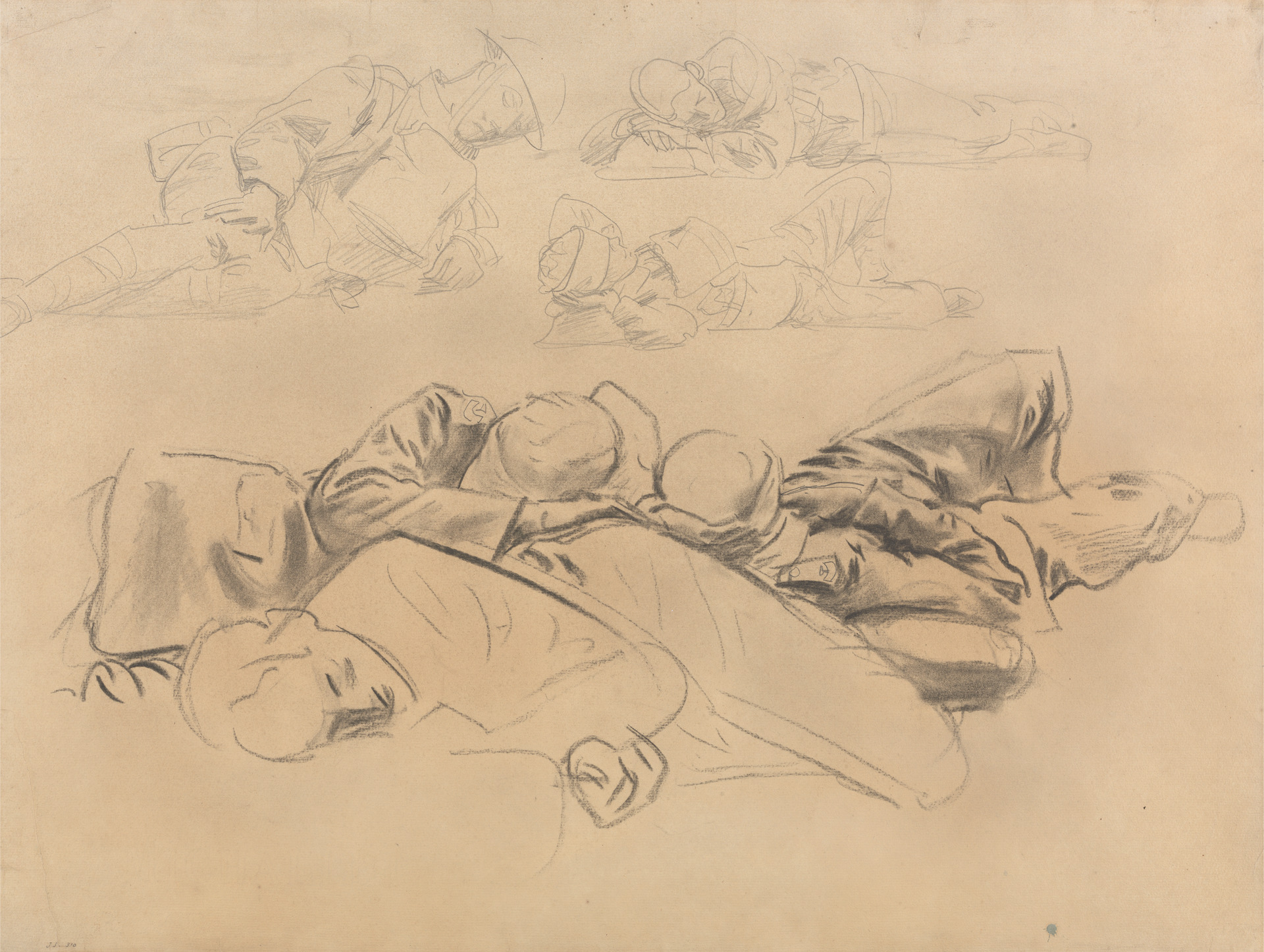
Study for Gassed Soldiers, John Singer Sargent, 1918. Yale Centre for British Art

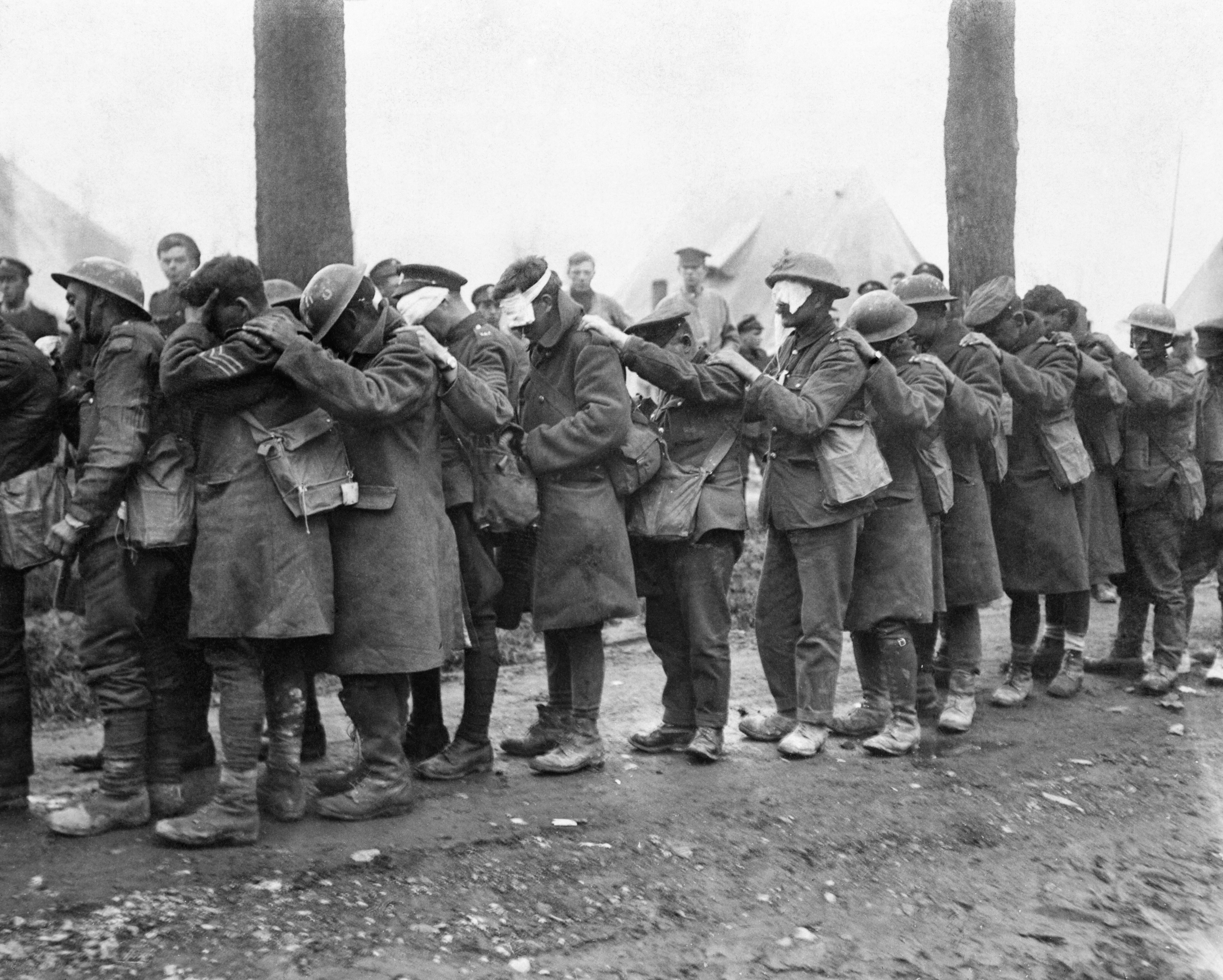
A photograph similar to Gassed of British troops blinded by poison gas during the Battle of Estaires, 1918

The painting measures 231.0 by 611.1 centimetres (7 ft 6.9 in × 20 ft 0.6 in). The composition includes a central group of eleven soldiers depicted nearly life-size. Ten wounded soldiers walk in a line along a duckboard towards a dressing station, suggested by the ropes on the right side of the picture. Their eyes are bandaged, blinded by the effect of the gas, so they are assisted by a medical orderly. The line of tall, blond soldiers forms a naturalist allegorical frieze, with connotations of a religious procession. Many other dead or wounded soldiers lie around the central group, and a similar train of eight wounded, with two orderlies, advances in the background. Biplanes dogfight in the evening sky above, as a watery setting sun creates a pinkish yellow haze and burnishes the subjects with a golden light. In the background, the moon also rises, and uninjured men play association football in blue and red shirts, seemingly unconcerned at the suffering all around them.

== History ==
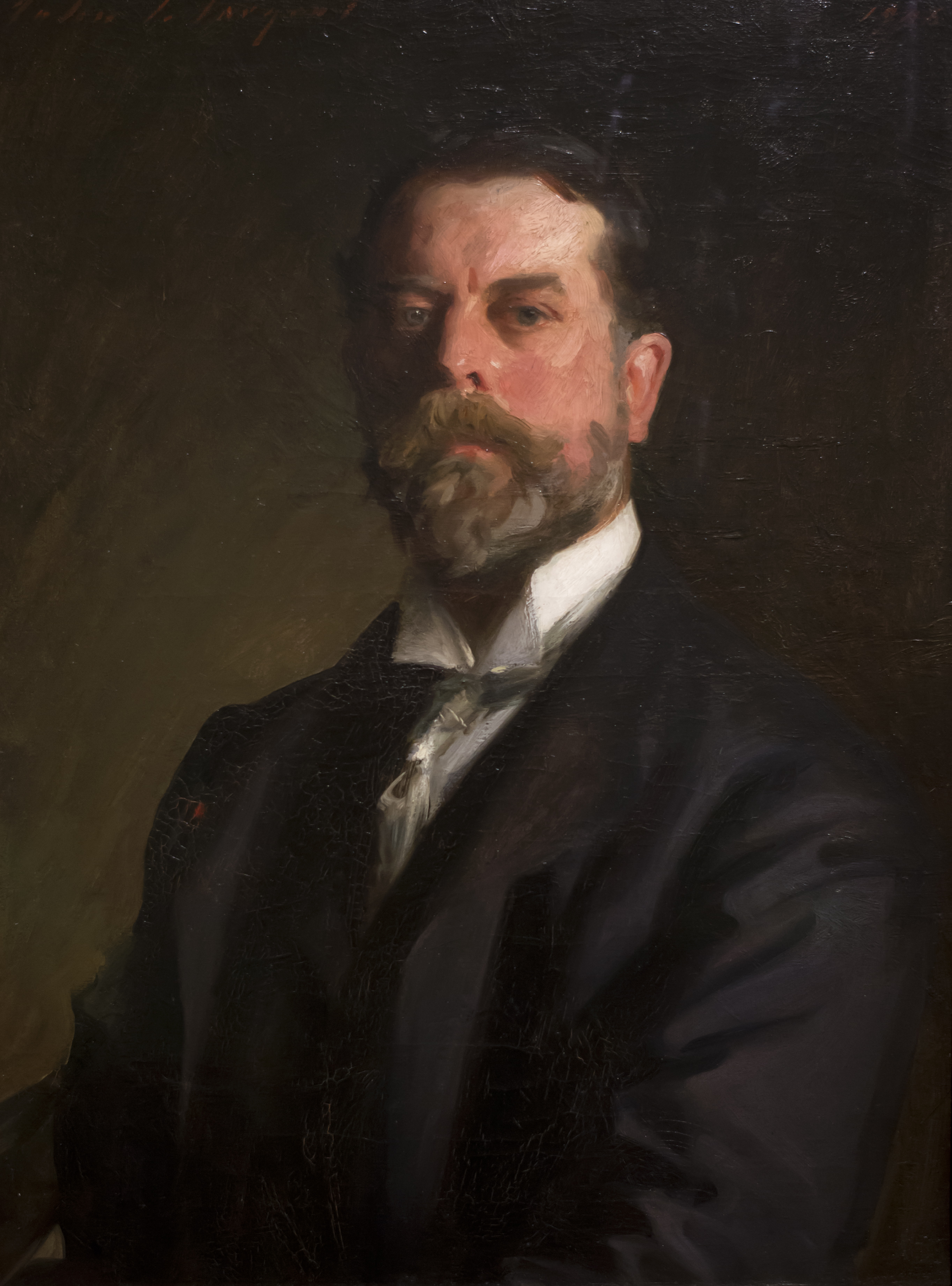
John Singer Sargent. Self Portrait c. 1906.

In May 1918, Sargent was one of several painters commissioned by the British War Memorials Committee of the British Ministry of Information to create a large painting for a planned Hall of Remembrance. The plan was a complement to the artworks commissioned by the Canadian War Memorials Fund since 1916 at the instigation of Lord Beaverbrook, who, by 1918, was serving as the British Minister of Information. Other works were commissioned from Percy Wyndham Lewis, Paul Nash, Henry Lamb, John Nash and Stanley Spencer. The large scale of the works was inspired by Uccello's triptych The Battle of San Romano. The plan for a Hall of Remembrance decorated by large paintings was abandoned when the project was incorporated with that for Imperial War Museum.

As an American painter, Sargent was asked to create a work embodying Anglo-American co-operation. Although he was 62, he travelled to the Western Front in July 1918, accompanied by Henry Tonks. He spent time with the Guards Division near Arras and then with the American Expeditionary Forces near Ypres. He was determined to paint an epic work with many human figures but struggled to find a situation with American and British figures in the same scene. On 11 September 1918, Sargent wrote to Evan Charteris:

The Ministry of Information expects an epic – and how can one do an epic without masses of men? Excepting at night I have only seen three fine subjects with masses of men – one a harrowing sight, a field full of gassed and blindfolded men – another a train of trucks packed with "chair à cannon" – and another frequent sight a big road encumbered with troops and traffic, I daresay the latter, combining English and Americans, is the best thing to do, if it can be prevented from looking like going to the Derby.

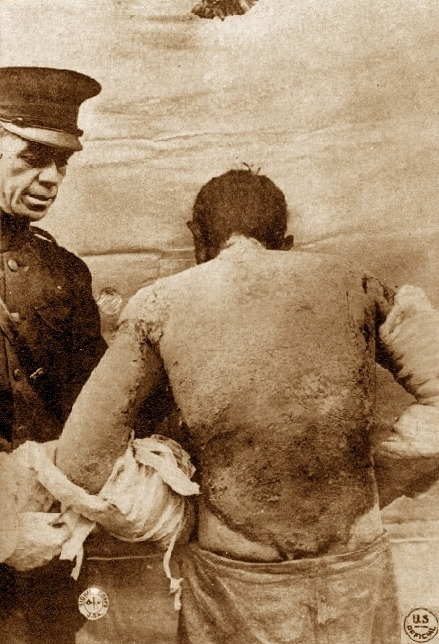
An American soldier with life-threatening mustard gas burns in 1918.

The "harrowing sight" referred to the aftermath of a German barrage that Sargent witnessed on 21 August 1918, at Le Bac-du-Sud, near Bailleulval between Arras and Doullens, in which mustard gas had been used against the advancing 99th Brigade of the 2nd Infantry Division and 8th Brigade of the 3rd Infantry Division of the British Army, during the Second Battle of Arras of 1918. Tonks described the experience in a letter from to Alfred Yockney on 19 March 1920:

After tea we heard that on the Doullens Road at the Corps dressing station at le Bac-du-sud there were a good many gassed cases, so we went there. The dressing station was situated on the road and consisted of a number of huts and a few tents. Gassed cases kept coming in, lead along in parties of about six just as Sargent has depicted them, by an orderly. They sat or lay down on the grass, there must have been several hundred, evidently suffering a great deal, chiefly I fancy from their eyes which were covered up by a piece of lint.... Sargent was very struck by the scene and immediately made a lot of notes. It was a very fine evening and the sun toward setting.

In his memoirs, General Haldane, the commander of VI Corps, one of Third Army's corps west of Bapaume, states that at 10:40 on 21 August the sun "burst through the mist" and so the German mustard gas was vaporized. One of his divisions, 2nd Division, had been advanced through the gassed area and had paused prior to resuming its successful advance: "without warning a considerable number of officers and men were 'gassed' and temporarily placed hors de combat. As the unfortunate victims were being helped, practically blinded, by their comrades on a field ambulance, John Sergeant happened to arrive on the scene. Shortly before he had told me that he had been commissioned to paint a picture which should be typical of the war, and I suggested 'tanks,' they being the latest military machine and a novel feature of it." However, as he later told Haldane, on seeing the gassed soldiers being led to the ambulance, "he decided that he has before him what he was seeking".

Sargent worked on preparatory sketches for a road scene crowded with soldiers but decided to focus on the dressing station. The War Memorials Committee agreed to change the subject of the commission, and the painting was created at Sargent's studio in Fulham from late 1918 to early 1919.

== Completion ==
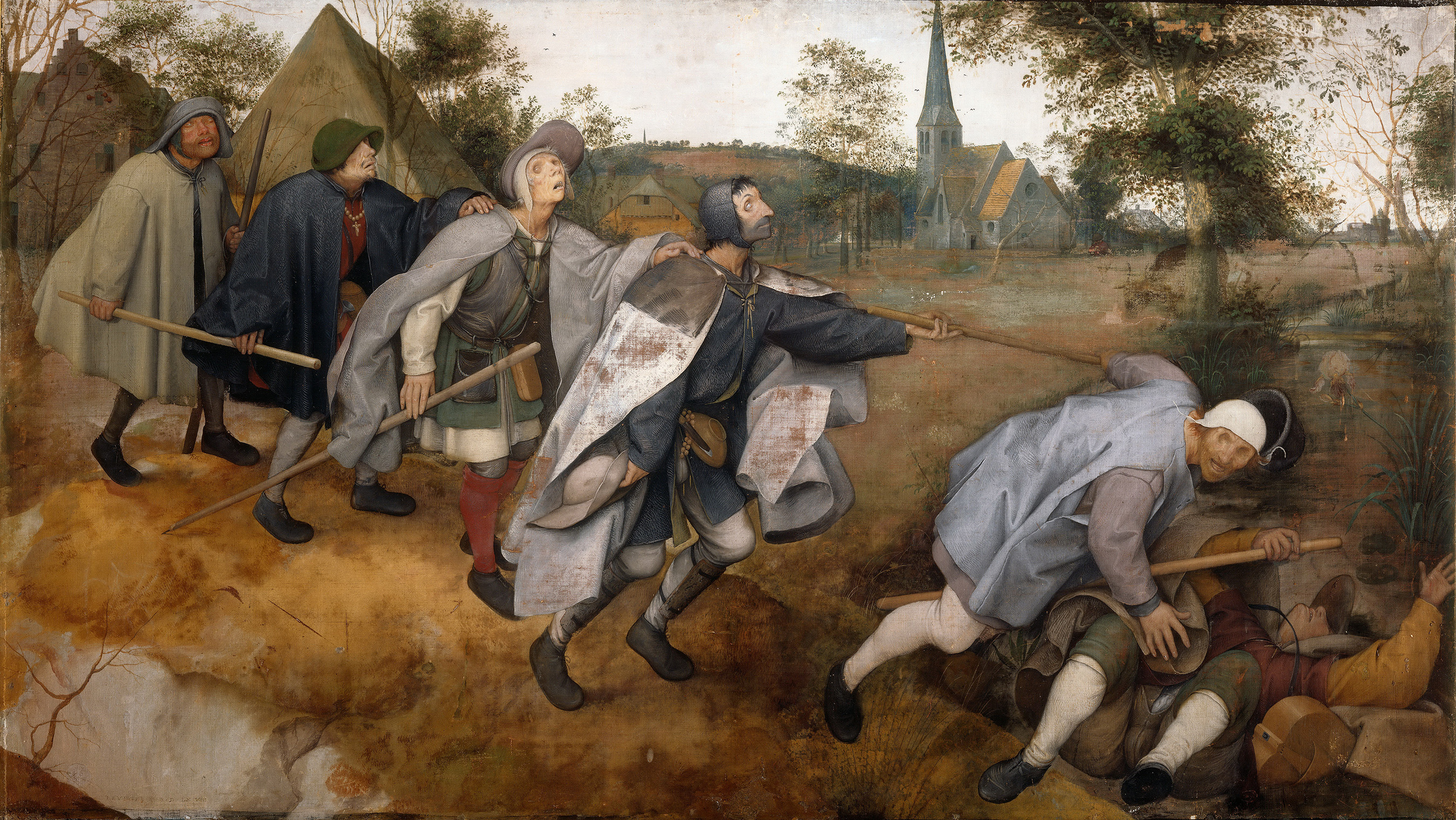
Pieter Bruegel the Elder. The Parable of the Blind, 1568. The painting is referenced by Sargent's.

The painting was completed in March 1919, and Sargent was paid his £600 fee. It was first displayed at the Royal Academy in London in 1919. It was voted picture of the year by the Royal Academy of Arts in 1919. The painting was not universally liked: E. M. Forster considered it too heroic. Winston Churchill praised its "brilliant genius and painful significance", but Virginia Woolf attacked its patriotism. It is now held by the Imperial War Museum, along with several charcoal studies for the painting. Other charcoal sketches are held by the Corcoran Gallery of Art. A small 10½ x 27¼ in. (26 x 69 cm) oil sketch, originally owned by Evan Charteris, was sold by Christie's in 2003 for £162,050 ($267,869).

The painting provides a powerful testimony of the effects of chemical weapons, vividly described in Wilfred Owen's poem Dulce et Decorum Est (although his poem describes the effects of chlorine gas). Mustard gas is a persistent vesicant gas, with effects that only become apparent several hours after exposure. It attacks the skin, the eyes and the mucous membranes, causing large skin blisters, blindness, choking and vomiting. Death, although rare, can occur within two days, but suffering may be prolonged over several weeks.

Sargent's painting refers to Bruegel's 1568 work The Parable of the Blind, with the blind leading the blind, and it also alludes to Rodin's Burghers of Calais.

== 2023 restoration ==
The painting's greenish-yellow color scheme—uncharacteristic of Sargent's usual work—was long interpreted as a deliberate attempt to evoke a queasy, toxic atmosphere. However, a major 2023 restoration revealed that a thick layer of yellowed varnish from the 1970s was actually responsible for this appearance. The cleaning exposed Sargent's intended color palette: pinks, mauves, and greens like those used by the impressionists. The newly visible rosy sunset and sunlit football match suggest that Sargent may have intended a more hopeful vision of life continuing after the horrors of war.

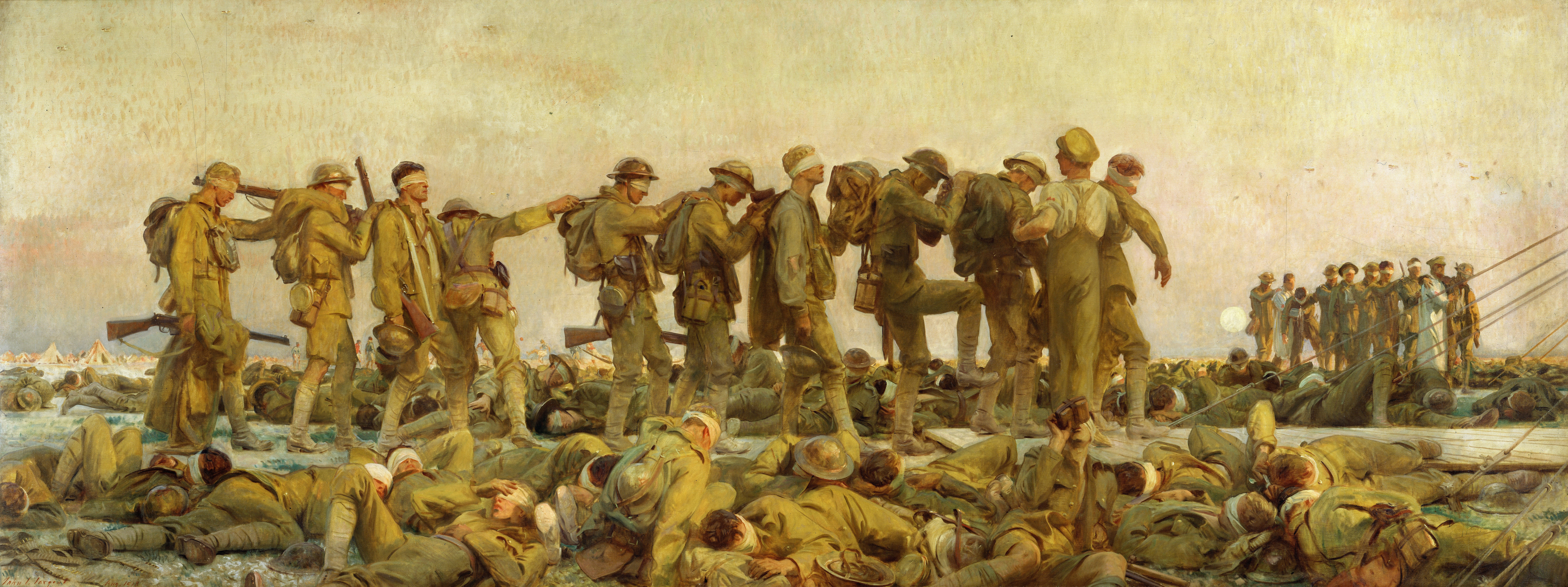
Before restoration

After restoration

== See also ==
- List of works by John Singer Sargent
