= British War Memorials Committee =

The British War Memorials Committee was a British Government body that throughout 1918 was responsible for the commissioning of artworks to create a memorial to the First World War. The Committee was formed in February 1918 when the Department of Information, which had been responsible for war-time propaganda and also operated a war artists scheme, became the Ministry of Information with Lord Beaverbrook as its Minister. Beaverbrook had been running, from London, the Canadian Government's scheme to commission contemporary art during the First World War and believed Britain would benefit from a similar project. Beaverbrook wanted the British War Memorials Committee to change the direction of Government-sponsored art away from propaganda of short-term value only during the conflict to a collection with a much longer lasting national value. Arnold Bennett, alongside Beaverbrook, was the driving force behind the BWMC and was instrumental in ensuring young artists, including those seen as modernist or avant-garde, were commissioned by the Committee over older British artists, many of whom were associated with the Royal Academy.

== Membership ==
The original members of the Committee were,

- Lord Rothermere, Chair of the BWMC,
- Alfred Yockney, former editor of The Art Journal and Secretary of the BWMC,
- Lord Beaverbrook,
- Arnold Bennett,
- Paul G. Konody, art critic,
- Charles Masterman,
- Muirhead Bone, artist member,
- Robbie Ross, art advisor,
- Campbell Dodgson, art advisor,
- Thomas Derrick, art advisor,

In addition, William Orpen and Henry Tonks acted as advisors to the Committee.

== Operations ==
Robert Ross suggested that by ensuring the artists worked to a set of standard size canvases they would produce pictures with a unified identity that would be appropriate for a national memorial. Ross suggested two sizes, 120 by 144 inches based on The Surrender of Breda by Velasquez and 72 by 125 inches, the size of The Battle of San Romano by Paolo Uccello. Smaller pictures would also be commissioned and an alternative large size, of 72 by 86 inches would be acceptable. In addition, four 'super-pictures' of 20 feet long by 7 feet high were to be commissioned on the theme of cooperation between Britain and its allies. The paintings were to be housed in a national Hall of Remembrance which would be built in London. The architect Charles Holden was recalled from France, where he was working for the Imperial War Graves Commission, to design the building. Muirhead Bone described the structure, which was never built, as a "kind of Pavilion", surrounded by a garden, with a main gallery leading to an oratory with a dedication to the "coming Brotherhood of Man for which we all pray."

The BWMC operated three separate schemes, with different terms and conditions, for artists depending on the scale and quantity of work they were expected to produce.

- Scheme One, or the Memorial scheme, was for the production of a single large piece for the central gallery of the Hall of Remembrance for which the artist would be paid £600 for a 20 foot by 7 foot 'super-picture' or £300 for a 72 by 125 or 72 by 86 inch canvas. Smaller works would be bought for £150. Artists on Scheme One contracts included John Singer Sargent, Augustus John, Charles Holmes, Walter Bayes, Philip Wilson Steer, George Clausen and Henry Tonks.
- Scheme Two was designed for younger artists who would be paid £300 per annum, plus any military pay they were receiving, in return for which they would turn over their entire output for six months. During this time they would be allowed no outside work at all, including teaching, but were expected to include one piece in the 'memorial' sizes. Artists on Scheme Two included Paul Nash, John Nash, Colin Gill, Bernard Meninsky, William Roberts and Henry Rushbury. The artists who had previously been working for the Department of Information war artist scheme, such as James McBey, Muirhead Bone and William Orpen, were also accommodated under this arrangement. The most prolific of the Scheme Two artists was John Laviers Wheatley who produced some 40 images of Naval subjects. Christopher Nevinson, was offered a Scheme Two contract but refused and eventually agreed to terms closer to that of Scheme One.
- Scheme Three gave the BWMC the first option to purchase work in return for facilities and access and was used by JD Fergusson, Frank Dobson and William Rothenstein.

In March 1918 the BWMC submitted a request to the War Office seeking the release from front-line service of 16 artists. The War Office refused permission for Eric Gill and Jacob Epstein to be released, and by the time the Army had processed the requests for Stanley Spencer and Darsie Japp the war was almost over. Although Muirhead Bone suggested nineteen well-known, modern women artists, including Dora Carrington and Orovida Pissarro for commissions, the BWMC ignored his advice and only recruited three women artists, Anna Airy, Dorothy Coke and Flora Lion but did not acquire any paintings from them. A number of pacifists and conscientious objectors were approached. Both Duncan Grant and Mark Gertler agreed to work for the Committee but the latter was refused permission by the body supervising conscientious objectors. Harold Knight refused to do any work that could be used as propaganda.

== Demise ==
The BWMC was not without its opponents; many in the Treasury believed that the Government should not be acting as a patron of the arts and the newly formed Imperial War Museum considered much of what the Committee was doing as part of their remitt. As a peer and a newspaper owner, Beaverbrook himself attracted controversy. Beaverbrook's rival newspapers attacked the workings of the Committee and Robbie Ross in particular. Towards the end of the war the British government gave permission for the proceeds from any BWMC exhibitions to be donated to war charities. Beaverbrook had already, without informing the Government, registered the title "British War Memorials Fund" as just such a private charity. The Acting Secretary of the Ministry of Information, R W Needham, objected that Beaverbrook had no right to generate income for a private charity by exhibiting Government funded artworks and that the artists involved had all worked for reduced fees in the national interest. If Beaverbrook wanted the BWMC to continue beyond the war as a private charity then it would have to become independent of the Ministry and then appeal directly to the public for funds. Beaverbrook abandoned the scheme and the war art collection was brought under the direct control of a new "Pictorial Propaganda Committee" within the Ministry. The Pictorial Propaganda Committee first met on the 24 July 1918 and quickly decided to abandon both the sculpture commissions and the Hall of Remembrance but to maintain the existing painting commissions and to designate the Imperial War Museum, IWM, as the future, permanent, home of the collection. In January 1919, the Secretary of the BWMC, Alfred Yockney joined the IWM to oversee the transition.

== Legacy ==
The BWMC left an artistic legacy that included some of the best art to be produced during World War I. This included the seventeen large paintings intended for the Hall of Remembrance, which included Gassed by John Singer Sargent and The Menin Road by Paul Nash, plus two large sculpture reliefs by Charles Sargeant Jagger and Gilbert Ledward and smaller canvases produced by a total of thirty-one artists. The structure and methods used by the BWMC provided the model on which Kenneth Clark based the, much larger, War Artists' Advisory Committee during the Second World War.
