= Canadian official war artists =

Canadian official war artists create an artistic rendering of war through the media of visual, digital installations, film, poetry, choreography, music, etc., by showing its impact as men and women are shown waiting, preparing, fighting, suffering, celebrating. These traditionally were a select group of artists who were employed on contract, or commissioned to produce specific works during the First World War, the Second World War and select military actions in the post-war period. The four Canadian official war art programs are: the First World War Canadian War Memorials Fund (CWMF), the Second World War Canadian War Records (CWR), the Cold War Canadian Armed Forces Civilian Artists Program (CAFCAP), and the current Canadian Forces Artists Program (CFAP).

A war artist will have depicted some aspect of war through art; this might be a pictorial record or it might commemorate how war shapes lives. The devastation of war is depicted in painting and drawing quite differently from what a camera can achieve.

The works produced by war artists illustrate and record many aspects of war, and the individual's experience of war, whether allied or enemy, service or civilian, military or political, social or cultural. The role of the artist and his or her work embraces the causes, course and consequences of conflict and it has been primarily an essentially educational purpose, but now is a culturally independent act of witness in contemporary Canada. Official war artists have been appointed by governments for information or propaganda purposes and to record events on the battlefield; but there are many other types of war artist.

== First World War ==
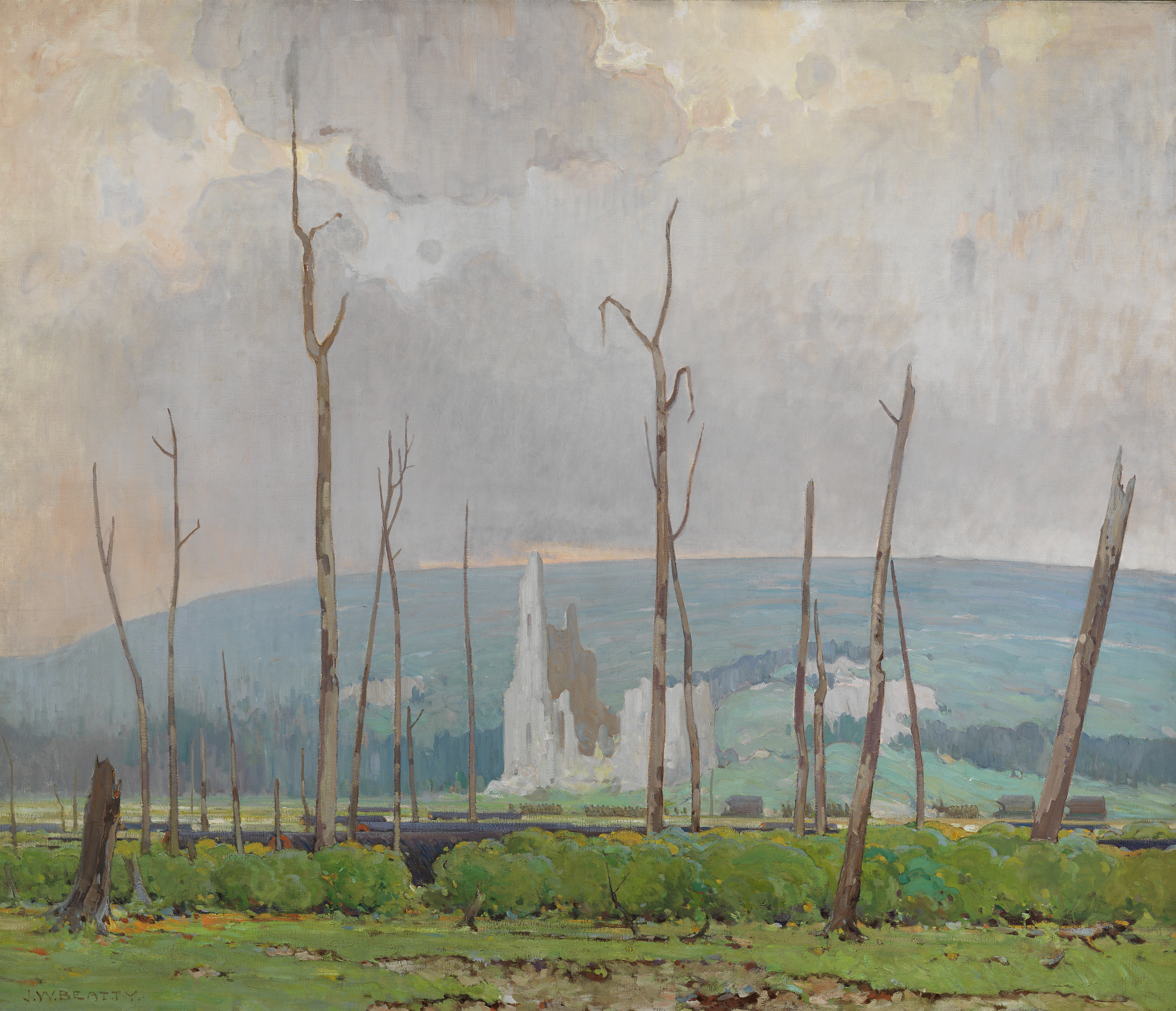
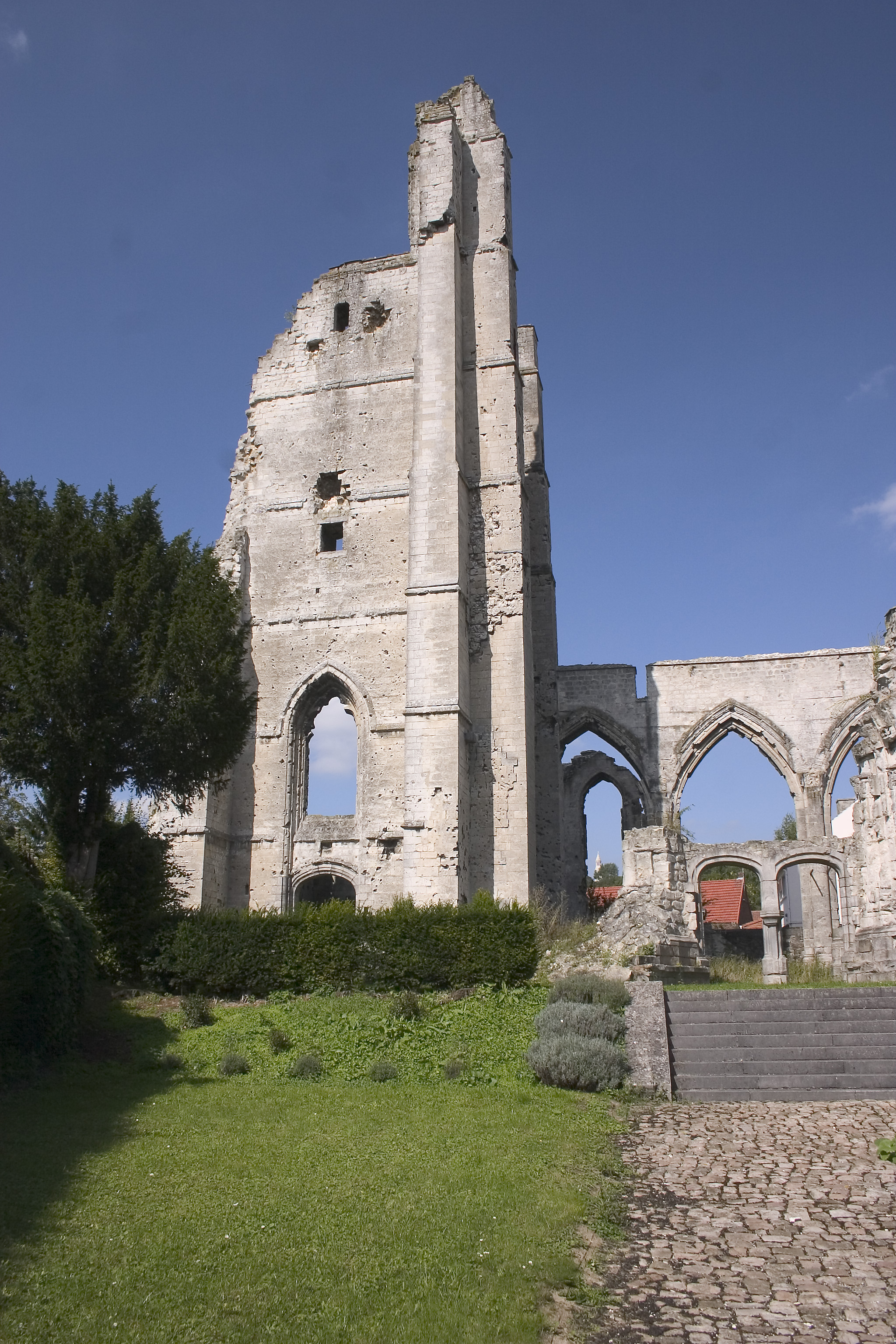
Ablain-St. Nazaire by John William Beatty in the collection of the Canadian War Museum compared to the ruins of the church as seen today.

Representative works by Canada's war artists have been gathered into the extensive collection of the Canadian War Museum. In the First World War, Canada developed an official art program under the influence of Lord Beaverbrook. The Canadian-born, England-based businessman viewed war art not only as a form of historical documentation, but also an expression of national identity. He provided leadership in creating the Canadian War Records Office in London in early 1916. Initially, the First World War was documented primarily using photography and film. Some of the extensive footage that official cinematographers produced of soldiers, machinery, and horses was later incorporated into Lest We Forget (1934), directed by Frank Badgley. It was the first feature-length documentary war film made in Canada.

In 1916 Lord Beaverbrook also established the Canadian War Memorials Fund, which was mainly privately funded and evolved into a collection of war art by over one hundred artists and sculptors in Britain and Canada. Under this program, Lord Beaverbrook commissioned one of the first significant Canadian paintings of the First World War, The Second Battle of Ypres, 22 April to 25 May 1915, 1917, by English Canadian artist and illustrator Richard Jack. This commission was intended to address the lack of visual documentation of this major battle.

Some artists who received commissions from the Canadian War Memorials Fund were considered "official" war artists. For example, the English artist Alfred Munnings was employed as war artist to the Canadian Cavalry Brigade. Munnings painted many scenes, including a mounted portrait of General Jack Seely on his horse Warrior in 1918 (now in the collection of the National Gallery of Canada, Ottawa). Munnings worked on this canvas a few thousand yards from the German front lines. When General Seely's unit was forced into a hasty withdrawal, the artist discovered what it was like to come under shellfire.

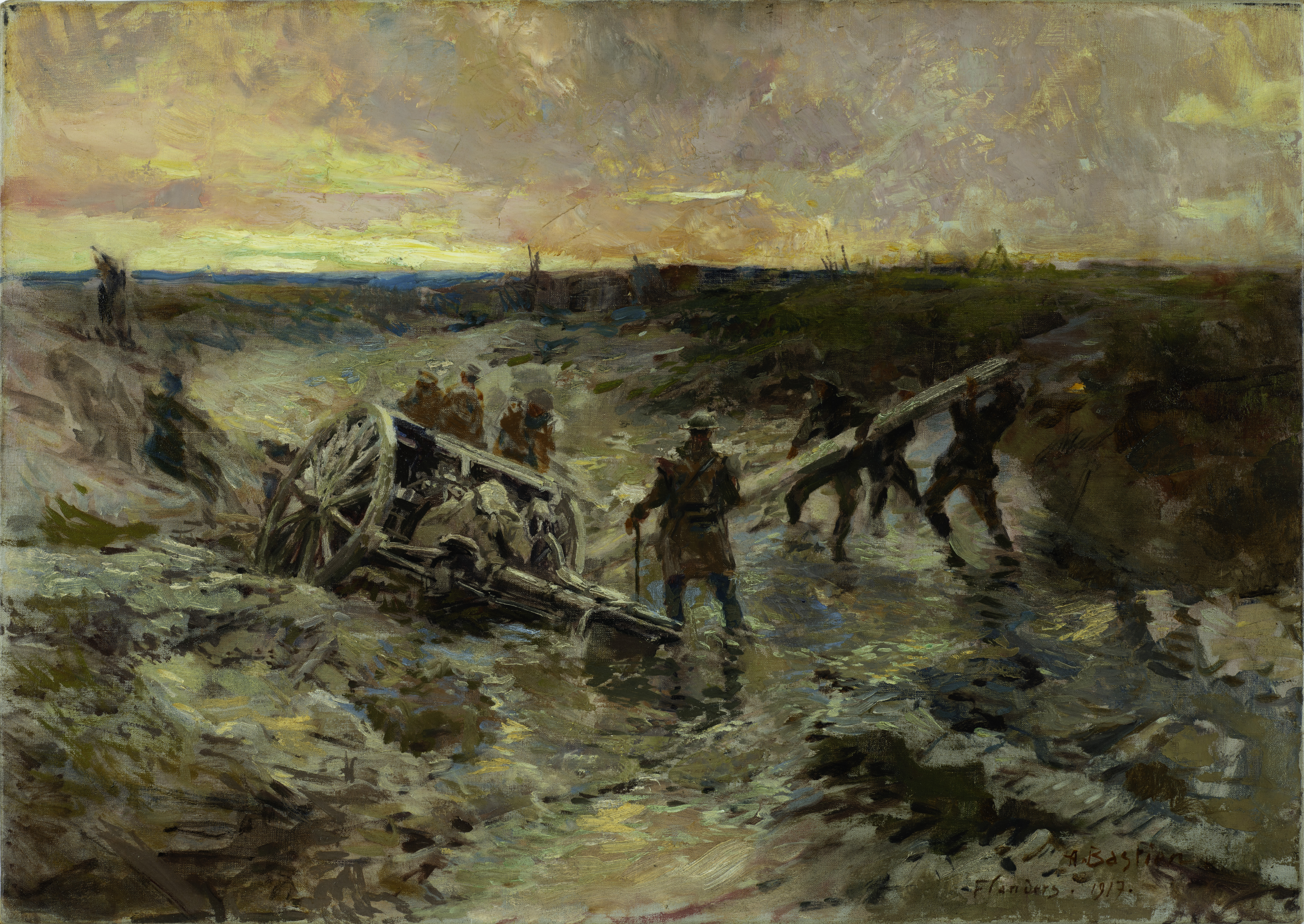
Alfred Bastien. Canadian Gunners in the Mud, Passchendaele, 1917

Munnings also painted Charge of Flowerdew's Squadron in 1918 (now in the collection of the Canadian War Museum, Ottawa). In what is known as "the last great cavalry charge" at the Battle of Moreuil Wood, Gordon Flowerdew was posthumously awarded the Victoria Cross for leading Lord Strathcona's Horse (Royal Canadians) in a successful engagement with entrenched German forces.

The Canadian Forestry Corps invited Munnings to tour their work camps, and he produced drawings, watercolors and paintings, including Draft Horses, Lumber Mill in the Forest of Dreux in France in 1918. This role of horses was critical and under-reported; and in fact, horse fodder was the single largest commodity shipped to the front by some countries.

The "Canadian War Records Exhibition" at the Royal Academy after war's end included forty-five of Munning's canvasses.

Another example of a war artist embedded with Canadian forces was the Belgian soldier-artist Alfred Bastien whose work is part of the permanent collection of the Canadian War Museum.

In Canada, a separate committee affiliated with the Canadian War Memorials Fund was led by the National Gallery of Canada. It commissioned depictions of the home-front and recommended Canadian artists to serve overseas. Many famous examples of Canadian war art were produced under this program, including A.Y. Jackson's A Copse, Evening, 1918, and Frederick Varley's For What?, 1918.

== Second World War ==
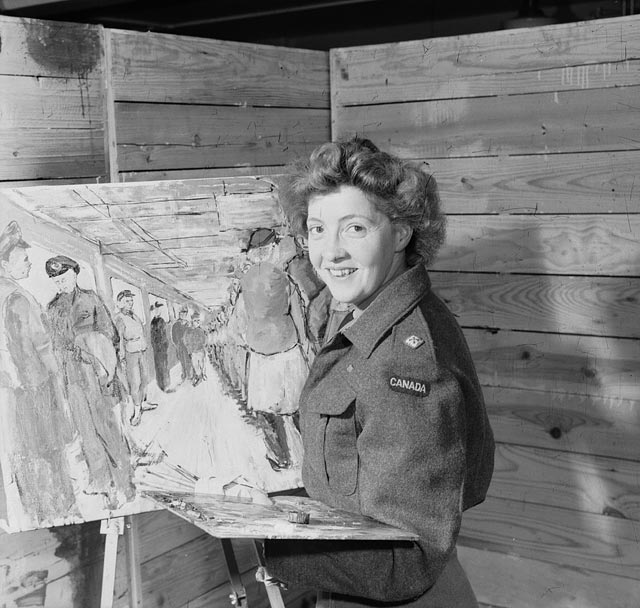
Second Lieutenant Molly Lamb of the Canadian Women's Army Corps

The Canadian War Records (CWR) was the name given to Canada's Second World War art program. The CWR produced two kinds of art: field sketches and finished paintings. The War Artists' Committee (WAC) recommended that the artists should attempt to share in the experience of "active operations" in order to "know and understand the action, the circumstances, the environment, and the participants." The ultimate goal was defined as "productions" which were "worthy of Canada's highest cultural traditions, doing justice to History, and as works of art, worthy of exhibition anywhere at any time."

There was a general appreciation of the need to develop what "the camera cannot interpret." The government recognized that "a war so epic in its scope by land, sea and air, and so detailed and complex in its mechanism, requires interpreting [by artists] as well as recording."

E. J. Hughes enlisted "at the Work Point Barracks in Esquimalt in 1939. Named the first “service artist” in 1941, he spent two winters in Ottawa before being posted to London, where he was attached to different regiments in England and Wales. His paintings of camp life and convoys reflect his keen attention to the details of vehicles, artillery, and uniforms. In 1943, on the Alaskan island of Kiska, he transformed sub-zero weather and howling gales into a powerful document of this remote theatre of war. He returned to Ottawa where he worked until 1946"

Second Lieutenant Molly Lamb of the Canadian Women's Army Corps was Canada's only woman official war artist in the Second World War. One of her most significant works is Private Roy, 1946, a painted portrait of Sergeant Eva May Roy. She was one of the few Black members of the Canadian Women's Army Corps at the time.

On the 65th anniversary of D-Day, the war artists were recognized and addressed directly in a Ceremony of Remembrance in the Canadian Senate,

What each of you achieved on the artist's canvas is more profound and more powerful than any words can express.

-- Hon. Greg Thompson, Minister of Veterans Affairs

== Recent conflicts ==
From 1946 to 2014 over 70+ civilian artists have participated in documenting the Canadian Forces. This was initially supported by the Canadian Armed Forces Civilian Artists Program (CAFCAP) and more recently by the Canadian Forces Artist Program headed by Dr. John MacFarlane. Internationally renowned artists who have participated in the Canadian Forces Artists Program include Gertrude Kearns, Adrian Stimson, Althea Thauberger, Tim Pitsiulak, and Rosalie Favell.

== Selected artists ==
=== First World War ===
This list shows selections from the authorized list of Official Canadian War Artists in A Checklist of the War Collections of World War I, 1914-1918, and World War II, 1939-1945 by R. F. Wodehouse (National Gallery of Canada, Ottawa, 1968). Their work in the Canadian War Museum can be looked up on https://www.warmuseum.ca/collections.

- Adam Sherriff Scott
- Cyril Henry Barraud
- John William Beatty
- Frederick Sproston Challener
- Arthur Crisp
- Maurice Cullen
- Kenneth Forbes
- Edmund Wyly Grier
- A. Y. Jackson
- C.W. Jefferys
- Franz Johnston
- Wyndham Lewis
- Arthur Lismer
- Frances Loring
- Mabel May
- David Milne
- Alfred James Munnings
- Paul Nash
- William Orpen
- George Agnew Reid
- William Roberts
- Albert H. Robinson
- William Rothenstein
- Charles Walter Simpson
- Dorothy Stevens
- Frederick Varley
- Homer Watson
- Florence Wyle

=== Second World War ===
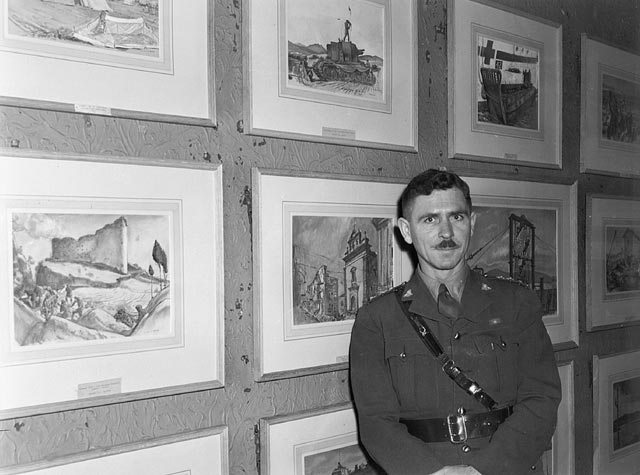
Capt. Will Ogilvie, Official army war artist, with some of his paintings, 9 February 1944

This is the authorized list of Official Canadian War Artists in the Second World War according to A Checklist of the War Collections of World War I, 1914-1918, and World War II, 1939-1945 by R. F. Wodehouse (National Gallery of Canada, Ottawa, 1968).

- Eric Aldwinckle
- Donald K. Anderson
- Aba Bayefsky
- Harold Beament
- Bruno Bobak
- Molly Lamb Bobak
- Miller Brittain
- Frank Leonard Brooks
- Albert Edward Cloutier
- Alex Colville
- Charles Fraser Comfort
- Patrick Cowley-Brown
- Orville Fisher
- Michael Forster
- Charles Goldhamer
- Paul Goranson
- Lawren P. Harris
- E. J. Hughes
- Robert Stewart Hyndman
- C. Anthony Law
- T. R. MacDonald, (1908-1978)
- Donald Cameron MacKay, (1906-1979)
- Rowley Murphy
- Jack Nichols
- William Abernethy Ogilvie
- George Pepper
- Moe Reinblatt
- Goodridge Roberts
- Carl Schaefer (artist)
- George Campbell Tinning
- Peter Whyte
- Tom Wood

=== Recent conflicts ===
- Edward Zuber (1932–2018)
- Suzanne Steele, 2008–2010, the first poet to serve as a war artist (Afghanistan)
- Scott Waters, 2003–4, 2012–14

== See also ==
- Military art
- War photography
- Richard Johnson
