= Robert Stewart Hyndman =

Canadian artist (1915–2009)

- Robert Hyndman in 2009 with a photograph of himself during the Second World War. The wartime portrait is by Yousuf Karsh
- Born: Robert Stewart Hyndman; June 28, 1915; Edmonton, Alberta, Canada
- Died: November 29, 2009 (aged 94); National Capital Region, Ontario, Canada
- Education: Central Technical School, Central Saint Martins College of Art and Design)
- Known for: portrait and landscape Painter
- Notable work: War artist during the Second World War
- Awards: Art & Heritage Award from the City of Ottawa

Robert Stewart Hyndman (June 28, 1915 – November 29, 2009) was a distinguished Canadian portrait and landscape artist based in the National Capital Region. His career spanned more than 70 years.

== Early life ==
Born in Edmonton, Alberta, Canada, Hyndman attended a primary school Shawnigan Lake School on Vancouver Island from 1928 to 1931. He moved with his family to Ottawa, Ontario in 1933. He received his early training at the Central Technical School in Toronto with Carl Schaefer and Charles Goldhamer. After graduating in 1937, Hyndman followed the lead of other young North American artists and moved to London, England to continue his studies at the Central School for Arts and Crafts (now the Central Saint Martins College of Art and Design).

== War service ==
With war looming, Hyndman returned to Canada in 1939 and joined the Royal Canadian Air Force (RCAF) in June, 1940. He served as a flight instructor at Uplands Airport in Ottawa from 1941–1943. From 1943 until 1944, Hyndman was stationed at Biggin Hill, England and flew Spitfires on bombing runs over the English Channel as part of RCAF 411 Squadron, 126 Wing. Hyndman’s drawings of his experiences caught the attention of government officials.

== Official war artist ==
Following his tour retirement (Hyndman flew 155 missions over France and the Netherlands) in September 1944, he was appointed an Official Second World War artist. Hyndman created a total of 68 paintings during his appointment. By war's end, Hyndman had painted most of the Canadian military’s senior commanders and many of the fighter aces of the RCAF.

While portraits formed the bulk of his production, he also captured his experiences as a pilot. Some of his works can be seen as part of the Beaverbrook War Art Collection’s touring Canvas of War exhibit, as well as on permanent display at the Canadian War Museum in Ottawa.

== Post-war career ==
Following World War II, Hyndman resettled in Ottawa where he embarked upon a successful career as a painter of portraits and murals. In 1959, he was commissioned by Chatelaine magazine to complete a portrait of Queen Elizabeth II. The Britannia Yacht Club collection of Hyndman's portraits of former Club Commodores includes the late Reg Bruce and his wife displayed in Bruce Neuk. The collection of the Royal Military College of Canada includes Hyndman's works. He also passed on his love of painting to others as a teacher. He taught at the Banff School of Fine Arts for eight summers (1964–1972), at Elmwood School (Ottawa) (1966–71) and at the Ottawa School of Art (1971–2007).

== Recognition ==
In 2000, he received the Art & Heritage Award from the City of Ottawa, and in 2001, on the 100th Anniversary of the election of Canadian former Prime Minister Sir Wilfrid Laurier, he presented his portrait of Prime Minister Laurier to then Prime Minister Jean Chrétien. In 2003, he received the Victor Tolgesy Award from the City of Ottawa.

== See also ==
- Canadian official war artists
- War artist
- War art
