= Elizabeth Bradford Holbrook =

Canadian artist

- Born: Elizabeth Mary Bradford; November 7, 1913; Hamilton, Ontario, Canada
- Died: February 23, 2009 (aged 95); Hamilton, Ontario, Canada.
- Education: Ontario College of Art
- Known for: Sculptor and designer
- Notable work: Federal Building "Wildlife and Industry" panels ca. 1952, "George Bernard Shaw" 1997, "Emanuel Hahn" 1952, "Family Tree" 1960.
- Awards: Lieut. Governor’s Silver Medal for Sculpture, 1935; National Sculpture Society of New York, Gold Medal, 1969 and the Canadian Portrait Academy Cleeve Horne Award - Best Portrait Sculpture, 1998

Elizabeth Bradford Holbrook, CM, O.Ont (7 November 1913 – 23 February 2009) was a Canadian portrait sculptor, medal designer, and liturgical artist.

== Education and training ==
Born in Hamilton, Ontario, on November 7, 1913, Elizabeth Bradford Holbrook was the great-great-granddaughter of the Hon. John Willson, the first speaker for the House in Upper Canada. Holbrook studied at the Hamilton Art School (1928–1931), Ontario College of Art (1932–1935), Royal College of Art in London, England (1936) and at Cranbrook Academy of Art in Bloomfield Hills, Michigan (1948). She studied with such artists as Hortense Gordon, John S. Gordon, John Sloan, Gustav Hahn, Emanuel Hahn, Rowley Murphy, and Carl Milles.

She was a lecturer in Sculpture at the Dundas Valley School of Art from 1965 to 1969, at the Burlington Cultural Centre from 1990–1993 and at McMaster University, Faculty of Arts in Hamilton, Ontario, from 1995–1999. Holbrook's portrait sculptures are represented in over 50 public collections worldwide.

== Subjects ==
Holbrook's subjects included Queen Elizabeth II; William Osler; Ellen Fairclough; John Diefenbaker; Emanuel Hahn; Henry Moore; among many others. Her works include the bronze 24' standing figure of a Royal Military College of Canada cadet 1979 (later known as 'Brucie'), which was a gift of the Royal Military College Club. She also produced a bronze bust of Colonel George Stanley, a former Royal Military College professor, who designed the Canadian Flag. For the Federal Building, Hamilton, Ontario, she completed eight large mezzo relief stone panels depicting wildlife and industry.

In 1996, she completed a sculpture of George Bernard Shaw for the then-new plaza in Niagara-on-the-Lake. Her last commissioned sculptures were of Conrad Black and his wife Barbara Amiel created in 2000 and 2002 respectively.

== Death ==
Holbrook died of natural causes in Hamilton on February 23, 2009. She is buried at St. John's Anglican Church, Ancaster, Ontario alongside her husband "Jack" Holbrook and her son William "Billy" Holbrook. The family is interred next to a liturgical headstone designed by Holbrook.

== Influenced ==
Holbrook mentored and influenced Canadian sculptor Christian Cardell Corbet.

== Memberships ==
- Order of Canada
- Royal Canadian Academy of Arts
- Ontario Society of Artists
- Sculptors' Society of Canada
- Canadian Portrait Academy, 1997 – Founding Member
- Order of Ontario
- International Art Medal Association (FIDEM)
- Medallic Art Society of Canada
- Canadian Group of Art Medallists

== Awards and honours ==
- 1935 Awarded the Lieutenant Governor's Medal for Painting at the Ontario College of Art (second recipient)
- 1969 Awarded the Gold Medal for Portraiture from National Sculpture Society of New York
- 1977 Awarded the Queen Elizabeth II Silver Jubilee Medal
- 1987 Awarded "Woman of the Year in the Arts" from the City of Hamilton, Ontario, Canada
- 1994 Awarded Member Hamilton Hall of Distinction
- 1982 Awarded the Ontario Society of Arts Award
- 1992 Awarded the 125th Anniversary of the Confederation of Canada Medal
- 1996 Appointment as Fellow, Ontario College of Art & Design
- 1997 Appointment to the Order of Ontario
- 1997 Appointment as Officer of the Order of Canada
- 1997 Awarded Honorary Doctorate by McMaster University

IN 2024 Holbrook's Order of Canada Medal was sold at public auction for $6,250.00.
