= George Campbell Tinning =

Canadian (1910-1996)

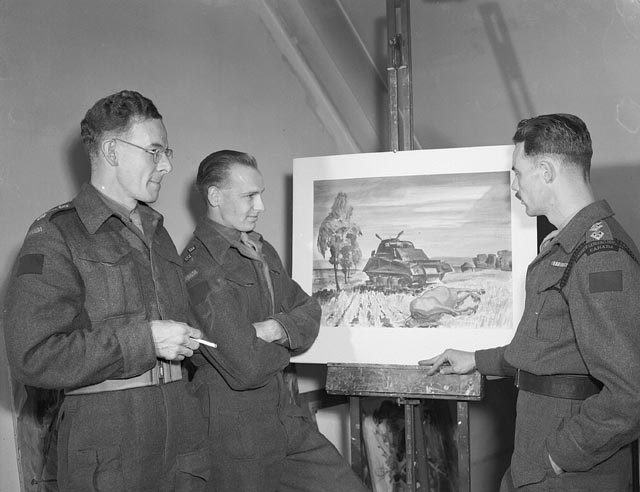
- George Campbell Tinning (left), war artist, at art exhibition, Horsham, England, August 23, 1945. (L-R) Capt. G. Campbell Tinning, Lt. Bruno J. Bobak, Capt. Lawren P. Harris.
- Born: February 25, 1910; Saskatoon, Saskatchewan, Canada
- Died: February 28, 1996 (aged 86); Montreal, Quebec, Canada
- Known for: Painter

George Campbell "Cam" Tinning, known as Campbell Tinning, RCA (February 25, 1910 – February 28, 1996) was a Canadian painter, graphic designer, muralist, and illustrator. He was an Official Second World War artist; the only one born in Saskatchewan. After the war, he resided in Montreal but travelled extensively and painted in every Canadian province, the United States, Jamaica, Italy, France, England and Scotland. In 1970, he was elected a full member of the Royal Canadian Academy of Arts.

== Early life ==
Tinning was born in Saskatoon, Saskatchewan, Canada, on February 25, 1910. He studied art in Winnipeg, Manitoba and Regina, Saskachetwan. Some of the Tinning family photographs are in the McCord Museum collection. In 1938, he attended the Eliot O'Hara School of watercolour in Maine and the Art Students League of New York. He moved to Montreal and in 1940 became a member of the Canadian Society of Painters in Water Colour. He exhibited at the 1939 New York World's Fair. In 1940, he was employed as a graphic designer at The Robert Simpson Company (Simpson's department store) at its St. Catherine Street location in downtown Montreal. In 1942 and 1948, he was awarded the Jessie Dow Prize for watercolour at the Art Association of Montreal.

== World War II ==
After serving in the Reserves, Tinning enlisted in the Black Watch (Royal Highland Regiment) in 1942 as a private. In 1943, he was appointed official war artist with the Historical Section of National Defense Headquarters as a lieutenant. Posted to Nova Scotia and Newfoundland, he painted east coast military installations throughout 1943. He was sent overseas and served in England, Italy, and the Netherlands. He was promoted to Captain in 1945 and returned to Canada where he was honorably discharged in 1946. He completed over 500 pieces as a Canadian War artist which are now in the Canadian War Museum in Ottawa.

== Post-war ==
Tinning settled in Montreal where he established his studio. In 1949, he travelled and painted in Newfoundland for two months. He exhibited these watercolours at the Montreal Museum of Fine Arts and published an article on his experiences in Canada's newest province. From 1948 to 1953, Tinning illustrated travel articles for the Lincoln-Mercury Times, a magazine published by the Ford Motor Company, Dearborn, Michigan. Notably, one of these was written by Aldous Huxley in 1951 on Lydiard Tregoz, a house in a village in Wiltshire, England. In the 1950s and 1960s, Tinning completed graphic designs for the Montreal Museum of Fine Arts and the Ritz Carlton Hotel in Montreal.

Apart from some prestigious patrons of the English Montreal establishment, many banks, hotels, stores, and factories commissioned works by Tinning. A series of template watercolours inspired by a French-Canadian legend was designed for rooms at the Manoir Baie Comeau, Quebec, in the 1960s; they were later destroyed by fire.

Tinning's 1960 mural for the Jenkins Valve Company in Lachine, Quebec, was destroyed during demolition of the factory in 2004, though photos of the mural are available. Sketches for this mural are preserved at the Lachine Museum in Lachine, Quebec. In 1960, the Ritz Carlton Hotel in Montreal commissioned Tinning to design the Maritime Bar. The hotel, renovated and reopened in 2012, still owns about 60 of his works.

In 1953, he was elected an Associate Member of the Royal Canadian Academy of Arts and he became a Full Member in 1970. Although Montreal remained his home and was his constant inspiration, Tinning also enjoyed rural Quebec – especially the Eastern Townships around Lake Memphramagog. He frequently visited family in the Okanagan and painted in this region of British Columbia. In the 1970s, Tinning experimented with abstract compositions. He painted floral still life throughout his career and it was his most popular genre.

Tinning had solo exhibits at many galleries across Canada including the Vancouver Art Gallery in 1942 and Walter Klinkhoff Gallery, Montreal, Quebec in 1963. During the 1980s and 1990s, his war art paintings were included a numerous group exhibitions such as Canadian Artists of the Second World War at the Robert McLaughlin Gallery in Oshawa, 1981, The Sweetest Spring at the Canadian War Museum in Ottawa, 1989, and Victory Parade: Canadian War Artists in Holland 1944-45 at the Legermuseum in Delft, Netherlands, 1991. In 1994, Tinning held his last solo exhibition at the Dominion Gallery, Montreal, two years before his death. His works are in many public collections, including the National Gallery of Canada, the Montreal Museum of Fine Arts, and the Canadian War Museum.

Tinning died in Montreal on February 28, 1996.

== Posthumously ==
There have been three exhibits of the work of Campbell Tinning since his death. The Moose Jaw Museum and Art Gallery curated a solo exhibition of Tinning war art in 1999 and more recently The Newfoundland Paintings. Canvas of War: Masterpieces from the Canadian War Museum, was held at the Canadian War Museum, 2000, and subsequently toured across Canada until 2004.

== See also ==
- Canadian official war artists
- War art
