= Patrick Cowley-Brown =

Canadian artist (1918–2007)

- Born: Patrick George Cowley-Brown; 1 February 1918; Singapore, Southeast Asia
- Died: 30 August 2007 (aged 89); Ottawa, Ontario
- Education: Vancouver School of Art with Frederick Varley; H. Faulkner-Smith School of Fine and Applied Art, Vancouver
- Known for: Official Canadian War artist

Patrick George Cowley-Brown (1 February 1918 – 30 August 2007) was a Canadian painter who was an Official War Artist from April 1944 until December 1946.

== Career ==
Cowley-Brown was born in Singapore, Southeast Asia and moved with his family to Vancouver, British Columbia in 1926. By 1935 they had settled in Victoria, British Columbia, and he attended the Vancouver School of Art studying with Frederick Varley. While there, he befriended Paul Goranson, sharing a studio with him later. He then attended the H. Faulkner-Smith School of Fine and Applied Art in Vancouver. He was teaching when the Second World War broke out.

He enlisted in the Royal Canadian Air Force (RCAF) from 1941 to 1946 and trained as a wireless air gunner. Posted to England in 1942, he became ill and returned to Canada. From 1942 to 1944, he worked at Rockliffe air force base where he painted and drew. During this period, he met Edwin Holgate and Charles Goldhamer, both of whom inspired him. In 1944, Cowley-Brown won first prize in the 1944 RCAF art competition.

He became an Official War Artist in 1944 and held the rank of flight lieutenant. His subject was the Western and Northwest Air Command and he painted locations associated with coastal air installations and stations on the West Coast and the Canada-US Alaska Highway (newly built in 1942 by the USA for a supply route to military forces in Alaska).

After the war, he studied in Mexico before resuming painting in British Columbia, living in Vancouver in 1945. He had solo exhibitions at the Vancouver Art Gallery (1947), and Victoria (1950). He exhibited with the British Columbia Society of Fine Arts in their 39th Annual Exhibition in 1949 and in the British Columbia Graphic exhibition at the Vancouver Art Gallery (1949). He was living on Gabriola Island at the time.

He then moved to Ottawa where he exhibited with the Canadian Group of Painters. In 1951, he began his career as a graphic designer for the Canadian Government and retired after 27 years to work full time as an artist.

His work is in the collections of the Canadian War Museum (nearly 200 sketches and paintings) and the Art Gallery of Greater Victoria. He died in Ottawa in 2007.
