= George Paginton =

Canadian artist (1901-1988)

- Born: George Alfred Paginton; December 24, 1901; Minety Common, Wiltshire, England
- Died: December 6, 1988 (aged 86); Toronto, Ontario
- Education: Ontario College of Art summer school, Port Hope, Ontario with J. W. Beatty
- Spouse: Jessie May Forster (married 1930)

George Paginton (December 24, 1901 – December 6, 1988) was a landscape painter.

== Life and career ==
George Paginton was born in England, and in 1904, was designated a ward of the state and sent to an orphanage. In 1912, he was sent to Canada, to Lindsay, Ontario as a British Home Child. In 1919, he moved to Toronto, and found work as a freelance commercial artist working for various companies, including Simpsons. In 1927, he attended the Ontario College of Art summer school in Port Hope, Ontario, studying with J. W. Beatty. In the same year, he was hired by the Toronto Daily Star in the art department, retiring in 1970.

His first exhibition was in the New Toronto Library in 1931. His second show was held in the Robert Simpson Company's art gallery in 1934, repeated with new work in 1936. Paginton also showed his work at the Art Association of Montreal and the Graphic Arts Society in Toronto and later, with the Canadian Society of Graphic Art. In 1965, his drawings and watercolours were shown at the Arts and Letters Club in Toronto. He died in Toronto on December 6, 1988.

In 2019, Paginton's work was shown posthumously in a retrospective organized with the help of his family titled George Paginton: Painting a Nation curated by Sharona Adamowicz-Clements and Darrin J. Martens for the Peel Art Gallery, Museum and Archives in Brampton.

== Art work ==
George Paginton was a landscape artist, inspired by his teacher, J. W. Beatty, and by Tom Thomson and the Group of Seven. Like Beatty, Paginton was a believer in painting the Canadian scene, and his job providing illustrations for the Toronto Star gave him the opportunity to travel widely, and in doing so, to paint.

His work is in a number of gallery collections such as the Art Gallery of Hamilton, the Peel Art Gallery, Museum and Archives Brampton, and the Robert McLaughlin Gallery, Oshawa.
