= Toni Onley =

Canadian painter (1928–2004)

- Born: Norman Antonio Onley; November 20, 1928; Douglas, Isle of Man
- Died: February 29, 2004 (aged 75) near Maple Ridge, BC
- Education: Douglas School of Fine Arts; Doon School of Fine Arts with Carl Schaefer; Instituto Allende, San Miguel (1957-1958)
- Awards: Member, Royal Canadian Academy of Arts; Canada Council grant to England (1963)
- Elected: Canadian Society of Painters in Water Colour; B.C. Society of Artists

Toni Onley OC RCA (November 20, 1928 – February 29, 2004) was a Manx-Canadian painter noted for his mastery of the watercolour medium to convey the changing skies of landscapes.

== Career ==
Onley was born in Douglas on the Isle of Man. He studied at the Douglas School of Fine Arts, and moved to Canada in 1948 and lived in Brantford, Ontario. In Canada he studied at the Doon School of Fine Arts with Carl Schaefer; then in Mexico at the Instituto Allende in San Miguel (1957-1958). Later he moved to Vancouver and finally Victoria, BC.

Among his works are many watercolours depicting the northern and western Canadian landscape. Onley created landscapes in the Canadian tradition, influenced by the philosophy and traditions of Oriental art. Icebergs, trees, water and coasts are prominent features of these artworks. He also painted abstractly, particularly during the 1960s when he produced his Polar series.

He was made an Officer of the Order of Canada in 1999. He also was a member of the Royal Canadian Academy of Arts. He died at the age of 75 in a plane crash on the Fraser River near Maple Ridge, British Columbia, while practising take-offs and landings in a Lake LA-4-200 Buccaneer amphibious plane.
