= Annapolis, Nova Scotia =

Annapolis, Nova Scotia may refer to:

- Annapolis Royal, Nova Scotia, a historic town, former colonial capital of Nova Scotia and currently the county seat for Annapolis County
- Annapolis County, Nova Scotia, one of Nova Scotia's 18 counties
- Annapolis River, running through the western part of the Annapolis Valley
- Annapolis Valley, in northwestern Nova Scotia along the Bay of Fundy famous for its scenery and agricultural products
- Annapolis Basin, a sub-basin of the Bay of Fundy
- HMCS Annapolis, the name of two Canadian warships
