= Bruno Bobak =

Canadian artist (1923–2012)

- Born: Bronislaw Jacob Bobak; 27 December 1923; Wawelówka, Poland (now Skalat, Ukraine)
- Died: 24 September 2012 (aged 88); Saint John, New Brunswick, Canada
- Education: Art Gallery of Toronto with Arthur Lismer.
- Known for: watercolour painter
- Spouse: Molly Lamb (m. 1945)

Bruno Bobak, CM RCA (born Bronislaw Jacob Bobak; 27 December 1923 – 24 September 2012) was a Polish-born Canadian Official war artist and art teacher. His main medium was watercolour painting but he also produced woodcuts.

== Early years and war artist ==
Born Bronislaw Josephus "Bruno" Bobak in Wawelówka, near Skalat, Poland (now Ukraine), Bobak's family emigrated and settled in Saskatchewan, Canada in 1925. He studied art with Arthur Lismer and Gordon Webber at the Art Gallery of Toronto (1933-1937), and with Carl Schaefer and Elizabeth Wyn Wood at the Central Technical School, Toronto (1938-1942).

Bobak joined the Canadian Army in 1942, following high school. He served in Europe with the Royal Canadian Engineers. After he won first prize in a Canadian Army Art Competition, he was named as an Official Second World War artist. He was Canada's youngest war artist in World War II.

== Teaching career ==
After the war Bobak returned to Canada and lived briefly in Ottawa before moving with his wife (whom he met in London) to Vancouver in 1947 to teach art at the Vancouver School of Art. The Bobaks moved one final time to New Brunswick in 1960 and he became artist in residence at the University of New Brunswick. Bobak was appointed Director of the University of New Brunswick's Art Centre. In 1983, the Sir George Williams Art Galleries, Concordia University, Montreal organized a touring retrospective of his work. Retired in 1986, Bobak remained in New Brunswick until his death.

In 1995, along with his wife, fellow war artist Molly Lamb Bobak, he became a Member of the Order of Canada.

== Personal ==
Bobak married Molly Lamb in 1945 and is survived by two children, Alexander Bobak (b. 1946) and Anny Scoones (b. 1957) and grandchild Julia Bobak.

== Collections ==
Bobak's work is primarily found in Canada, but can be found also in the United States, Poland and Britain.

== Recognition ==
On 8 September 1998 Canada Post issued 'The Farmer's Family (detail), 1970, Bruno Bobak' in the Masterpieces of Canadian art series. The stamp was designed by Pierre-Yves Pelletier based on a watercolour painting The Farmer's Family (1970) by Brunislaw Jacob Bobak in the Beaverbrook Art Gallery, Fredericton, New Brunswick. The 90¢ stamps are perforated 12.5 X 13 mm and were printed by Ashton-Potter Limited.

== Death ==
Bruno Bobak died 24 September 2012, at age 88. He had been diagnosed with lung cancer earlier that summer.

== Awards ==
- Victor Martyn Lynch-Staunton Award (1971)
- Order of Canada
- Queen Elizabeth II Silver Jubilee Medal
- Jesse Dow Prize, Montreal Museum of Fine Arts
- C.W. Jefferys Award, Canadian Society of Graphic Art
- Honorary Doctor of Letters from Saint Thomas University 1984
- Honorary Doctor of Literature from the University of New Brunswick 1986
- Royal Canadian Academy of Arts

== See also ==
- Canadian official war artists

=== Archives ===
There is a Molly Lamb Bobak and Bruno Bobak fonds at Library and Archives Canada. The archival reference number is R5336, former archival reference number MG30-D378. The fonds covers the date range 1930 to 2000. It consists of 2.3 meters of textual records, 211 photographs, and other graphic media (drawings, prints, watercolours, etc).

== Bibliography ==
- Bernard Riordon, Herménégilde Chiasson, and Herb Curtis, Bruno Bobak: The Full Palette (Goose Lane Editions and Beaverbrook Art Gallery: Fredericton, NB., 2006).
