= Donald K. Anderson =

Canadian artist (1920-2009)

- Born: Donald Kenneth Anderson; 1920; Toronto, Canada
- Died: May 11, 2009 (aged 88–89) near Toronto
- Known for: artist

Donald K. Anderson (June 26, 1920 – May 11, 2009) was Canada's last surviving Royal Canadian Air Force (RCAF) Official Second World War artist. He was known for his character studies, depictions of people, and action scenes. He said of his work that he believed it was like a story about people, and that he should "select, establish a mood and record".

== Career ==
Anderson was born in Toronto and attended Danforth Technical School where C. W. Jefferys told him what made a historical artist. At the Ontario College of Art and Design (OCAD), he learned to draw from J. W. Beatty, Franklin Carmichael and Rowley Murphy. He graduated at the beginning of the Second World War.

He enlisted in the Royal Canadian Air Force in April 1941 and was employed for a time as an NCO artist in the Directorate of Public Relations at Air Force Headquarters in Ottawa, before being promoted to flight sergeant and from spring 1944 to 1945, serving as an Official War Artist. He was sent overseas and painted scenes derived from his postings, to London, Scotland, and mainland Europe, as well as portraits. He was posted with different squadrons, among them the No. 404, Nos. 431 and 434 (Bomber Command), then he was sent to Europe for attachment to No. 127 Wing, a Spitfire formation consisting of Nos. 403, 416, and 421 Squadrons. He stayed with that organization until June 1945, witnessing the static winter war, the crossing of the Rhine, and the final advance into Germany.

During the war, several dramatic events occurred to him. Among them were two incidents in 1945, the "Hangover Raid" (the New Year's Day raid that devastated the Luftwaffe) – about which he created six works and the occasion when an American B-17 Flying Fortress crashed at Evere, Belgium, skidding into a hangar filled with Anson aircraft before exploding in a fireball composed of 3,000 pounds of bombs and hundreds of litres of gas. Anderson, a few feet away, was bowled over but unhurt. (He subsequently captured the moment in The Day a Flying Fort Landed (1945), which he let the Robert McLaughlin Gallery in Oshawa use as the cover for the catalogue for its exhibition Canadian Artists of the Second World War). Anderson was on one of three trucks with food supplies sent into Bergen-Belsen concentration camp in April 1945. He drew in his sketchbooks the survivors (location unknown). His sketch titled Belsen (Canadian War Museum) was reproduced in Mark Celinscak's Distance from the Belsen Heap: Allied Forces and the Liberation of a Nazi Concentration Camp.

He is represented in the Canadian War Collection by 89 works. After his discharge, he became a freelance illustrator in Montreal. In the years that followed his discharge, he won six Merit and Medal awards from art directors' clubs in Montreal and Toronto.

Anderson's specialty was historical subjects. One of his paintings, Maisonneuve's founding of Ville-Marie, painted for Confederation Life Association's Gallery of Canadian History, was presented to the city of Montreal and hangs in City Hall. Another was of "The founding of Montreal" and is in the collection of Cobourg's Museum Foundation. He did other historical illustrations, one for a two-volume history, Canada's first bank: A History of the Bank of Montreal (1966–67) (in two volumes) written by Merrill Denison.
