= C. Anthony Law =

Canadian artist (1916–1996)

- Born: Charles Anthony Francis Law; 15 October 1916; London, England
- Died: 15 October 1996 (aged 80); Halifax, Nova Scotia, Canada
- Education: Ottawa Art Association with Franklin Brownell and F.H. Varley (1934–1937) while he studied at the University of Ottawa (1931–1936); with Frank Hennessey in the Gatineau and Gaspé areas in Quebec (1935–1939); in Quebec City, instruction from Percival Tudor-Hart.
- Known for: naval official war artist of the Second World War, painter
- Spouse: Jane Brumm Shaw (1917–2010) (m. 1942)
- Awards: Distinguished Service Cross (DSC)

C. Anthony (Tony) Law DSC D.Lit (1916–1996) was a Canadian naval Official War Artist of the Second World War. He served as a naval officer throughout the war and was known for engaging with enemy coastal convoys off France, and twice mentioned in dispatches. In 1944, he was awarded the Distinguished Service Cross (DSC) for 15 successive actions during the Normandy landings. After the war, he stayed with the Royal Navy, retiring in 1966. The Art Gallery of Nova Scotia held a major retrospective of his work in 1989.

== Career ==
Law was born in London, England and came with his family to Canada in 1917, to Quebec City. He attended Upper Canada College in Toronto (1928–1931).

His talent as an artist was discovered and encouraged by Dr. Marius Barbeau. He got his B.A. at the University of Ottawa (1931–1936) and became interested by the Group of Seven collection in the old National Gallery (the building that is now Ottawa's Museum of Nature), taking art lessons from Franklin Brownell and F.H. Varley at the Ottawa Art Association (1934–1937). In Ottawa, he befriended Frank Hennessey with whom he painted in the Gatineau and Gaspé areas (1935–1939). In his hometown of Quebec City, his art teacher was Percival Tudor-Hart.

In 1937, he held his first solo show in Quebec City and in the same year, joined the Royal Canadian Ordnance Corps as Lieutenant. In 1939, he was awarded the Jessie Dow Prize for a landscape in oils. In 1940, he transferred to the Royal Canadian Navy Volunteer Reserve and sailed for England, where he served on ships before joining the Motor Torpedo Boat Command and later becoming the commander of the 29th Canadian Motor Torpedo Boat Flotilla of the Royal Navy at Dover, which was stationed along the English Channel.

He was involved in the action against the German battleships Scharnhorst and Gneisenau in 1942 which he depicted in paint (Canadian War Museum). Even at war, he still found time to paint, usually when ashore during refits. In 1943, for example, he received a temporary assignment that enabled him to record some of Canada's more notable vessels.

In an interview for the Quebec Chronicle-Telegraph in December 1943, he said certain battles were "unforgettable". Brilliant light came from the star shells, so he could paint in the middle of the night. In 1944, he was awarded the Distinguished Service Cross for 15 successive actions during the Normandy landings. After the destruction of the 29th Flotilla in 1945, which occurred when Law was absent, Law became an official war artist.

He held three solo shows in 1950 and 1951 in Ottawa, before taking up his duties of first Lieutenant-Commander aboard an aircraft carrier, then in 1955 he became second-in-command of an Arctic patrol ship. In 1957, his paintings were exhibited at the Provincial Museum in Halifax. He also had a show of his Arctic paintings at the Robertson Gallery, Ottawa in 1961, the year he took command of a destroyer. Afterwards, he was made Lieutenant-Commander of a squadron. He retired from the navy in 1966.

After his retirement, he devoted his time to painting. Law moved with his wife, artist Jane Shaw, to Halifax in the 1950s, where Law helped create both Saint Mary's University Art Gallery and the Art Gallery of Nova Scotia (AGNS). He was Chairman of the AGNS's Board of Governors from 1977 to 1979 and artist-in-residence at Saint Mary's University from 1967 to 1980.

A retrospective exhibition of his paintings was held at the Nova Scotia Museum of Fine Arts Centennial Art Gallery in 1968. He was a member of the Nova Scotia Society of Artists and from 1973 to 1975 a governor of the Canadian Conference of the Arts. He had a retrospective exhibition at the AGNS in 1989, and a joint exhibition with his wife at Saint Mary's University Art Gallery in 1996.

His works are held in public collections such as the Beaverbrook Art Gallery, the Confederation Centre of the Arts, the Winnipeg Art Gallery, the Canadian War Museum, the Musée naval de Québec and the House of Commons. In 1981, he was awarded the honorary degree of doctor of letters by the Senate of Saint Mary's University.

In 1989, he had published a book about the Motor Torpedo Boat Flotilla, titled White Plumes Astern: Short Daring Life of Canada's Motor Torpedo Boat Flotilla (Nimbus Publishing Ltd, Halifax, 1989 ISBN 978-0-921054-27-6). An interview with Law is available in St Mary's University. Law died in Halifax in 1996.
