= Miller Brittain =

Canadian artist (1912–1968)

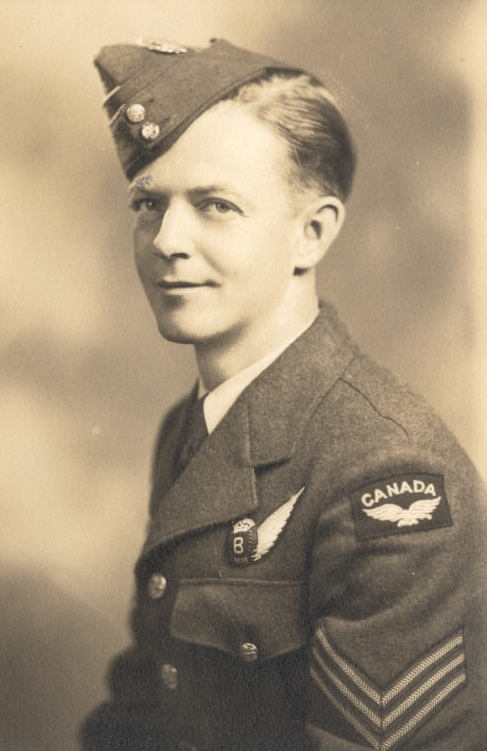
- Brittain in 1942
- Born: Miller Gore Brittain; November 12, 1912; Saint John, New Brunswick, Canada
- Died: January 21, 1968 (aged 55); Saint John, New Brunswick
- Education: Saint John Vocational School, Arts Students League of New York
- Known for: Painter
- Movement: Social realism, Irony
- Spouse: Constance Mary Starr (m. 1952; died 1958)
- Children: 1
- Awards: Canadian Centennial Medal

Miller Gore Brittain (November 12, 1912 – January 21, 1968) was a Canadian artist from Saint John, New Brunswick. He was largely known for creating paintings and drawings encapsulating social realism.

== Early life ==
Miller Gore Brittain was born on November 12, 1912, in Saint John, New Brunswick, to parents James Firth Brittain and Margaret Bartlett Lord. He was educated at the Saint John Vocational School (now Harbour View High School), where he took art classes. During his childhood, he was also a student at the Saint John Art Club, where he studied art with Elizabeth Russell Holt. He also studied art under Harry Wickey in New York City. In 1932, after living in New York, he returned to Saint John, where he worked at clerical and construction jobs and opened an art studio on the waterfront. During this period, he captured realistic scenes of everyday life in the city which incorporated social commentary. During the 1930s, he joined the Oxford Group, a Christian organization.

== Life in Saint John ==
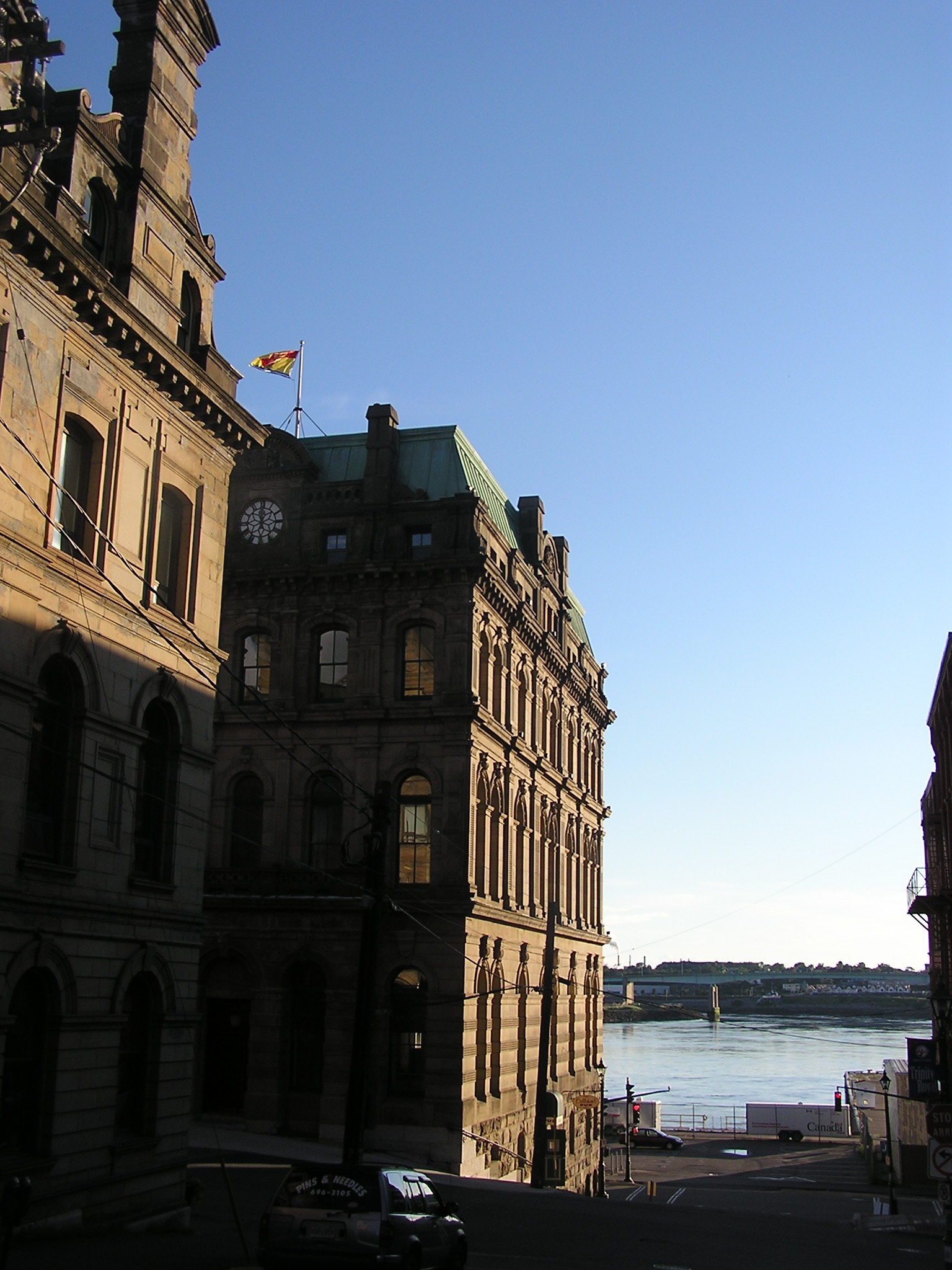
Princess St. in uptown Saint John near Brittain's studio.

After studying in New York, Brittain felt he didn't have to leave the region to make a career as an artist. However, at the time Saint John was still recovering from three major fires and was in the middle of the Depression. As a young man he worked as a draftsman and worked on the docks while working on his craft amongst a thriving arts community including Ruth Starr, Ted Campbell, Fred Ross and Jack Humphrey. In January 1949, his first major exhibit was held at the New Brunswick Museum in Saint John. The exhibition was so popular he went on to do a series of solo shows in New York.

Brittain was an icon of the Saint John arts community and presence is still felt in the city's arts scene today. The popular Britt's Pub, named for the artist, is on the ground floor of his studio at 42 Princess St.

== Career ==
Brittain is considered one of Canada's most prolific painters. His work broke from the style current at the time of the Group of Seven when landscapes dominated Canada's art scene. Brittain focused on working class life in his hometown of Saint John with his signature style of social realism. He was a founding member of the Federation of Canadian Artists in 1941.

In the early 1940s, Brittain joined the Royal Canadian Air Force (RCAF) and was posted to the 78th Squadron of the R.A.F. Bomber Command, as a bomb-aimer. He was commissioned in November 1944 and was awarded the Distinguished Flying Cross. In 1945, he was appointed an Official Second World War artist. One of his works, Night Target, Germany (1946), depicts a bombing raid over Germany.

After the war, his paintings took on a more surreal aspect, taking as their subject biblical topics, abstract figures, nudes and flowers. In 1947, Brittain won a prize from the Canadian Society of Graphic Art and the next year he held two one-person shows at St. John in the New Brunswick Museum and in Dayton, Ohio, at the Dayton Museum.

== Personal life and death ==
Brittain married Constance Mary Starr on January 14, 1952. He was devastated by her death from cancer seven years later and was treated several times for alcoholism in his later life. In December 1967, Brittain suffered from a stroke. He later died following an illness at the age of 55 on January 21, 1968, in the Saint John General Hospital.

== Posthumous reputation ==
In 1968, Brittain was awarded the Canadian Centennial Medal posthumously for his contribution to Canadian art. Brittain's work is held in private collections and a number of art galleries in Canada including the Beaverbrook Art Gallery, the National Gallery of Canada and the Canadian War Museum and a retrospective of his work has been held at the Art Gallery of Nova Scotia (2007) which travelled to the McMichael Canadian Art Collection. In 1983, 11 cartoon works done by Brittain were donated to the New Brunswick Museum by his daughter, Jennifer Brittain.

The National Film Board of Canada produced a film based on his life in 1981. The film was awarded Best Overall Entry at the Atlantic Film Festival in 1982.

== Record sale price ==
In January 2022 his 1964 painting Figures on a Beach sold for $330,000 CAD in an online auction held by Liz Isaac & Citadel Gallery Auctions owned by Mario Brideau and Liz Isaac of Saint John. This was a record sale price for an oil painting by Brittain. The work was part of the estate of Brittain's daughter Jennifer.

== See also ==
- Canadian official war artists
- War artist
- Military art
