= Suzanne Steele =

Métis poet

- Education: University of British Columbia, BMus; University of Western Ontario, MLIS; University of Exeter, PhD
- Occupation: Poet

Suzanne Steele is a Métis poet and academic. She worked as an Official Canadian War Artist in Afghanistan between 2008 and 2010. In 2017, Steele, in partnership with Jeff Ryan, premiered the symphonic/choral work entitled Afghanistan: Requiem for a Generation.

Steele gained an undergraduate degree in music from the University of British Columbia, a Master of Library and Information Science from the University of Western Ontario in 1991 and her PhD from the University of Exeter in 2017. Her PhD thesis was entitled "The Art of Witness: Truth, Process, and Form in the Work of Robert Graves, Mary Borden, and David Jones".
