= Charles Walter Simpson (Canadian artist) =

Canadian artist and illustrator (1878–1942)

- Born: 16 April 1878; Montreal, Quebec
- Died: 16 September 1942 (aged 64); Montreal, Quebec
- Known for: artist and illustrator

Charles Walter Simpson RCA (1878–1942) was a Canadian artist and illustrator.

== Life and work ==
Simpson was born in Montreal, Quebec on 16 April 1878 He died in Montreal on 16 September 1942.

Beginning in January 1918, he served with Canadian forces in the First World War. Simpson was one of the first group of "official war artists"—Lord Beaverbrook arranged for Simpson, along with Frederick Varley, J.W. Beatty and Maurice Cullen to be sent overseas to record Canada's participation in the conflict.

Simpson was a member of the Royal Canadian Academy of Arts. His diploma submission, Indian Summer, Montreal Harbour was deposited in the collection of the National Gallery of Canada in 1921.

Simpson worked as an illustrator, creating images for books commissioned by various firms to promote their industries or commemorate their achievements. Legends of the St. Lawrence(1926) by Katherine Hale was commissioned by the Canadian Pacific Railway Company to be used as a luxury gift for children who were travelling on the company's around the world tours.

== Selected works ==
Simpson's published works encompass 43 works in 48 publications in 2 languages and 128 library holdings.

- 1940 — The Mechanics' Institute of Montreal: One Hundredth Anniversary 1840-1940
- 1936 — Canadian Pacific Rockies by Betty Thornley
- 1936 — From Rags to Writing Paper: a Series of Twelve Sketches by Charles W Simpson
- 1933 — Canadian Cities of Romance by Katherine Hale
- 1932 — August Sixth, Nineteen Thirty Two, the Opening of the Welland Ship Canal: a Canadian Conception, a Canadian Achievement by Canada
- 1929 — Croquis montréalais by Victor Morin (English title: Old Montreal with Pen and Pencil)
- 1927 — Le Conseil de Québec de 1769
- 1926 — Legends of the St. Lawrence by Katherine Hale
- 1925 — Légendes du Saint-Laurent by Amelia Beers (Warnock) Garvin
- 1919 — Cotton by Dominion Textile Company Limited, Montreal

== Gallery ==
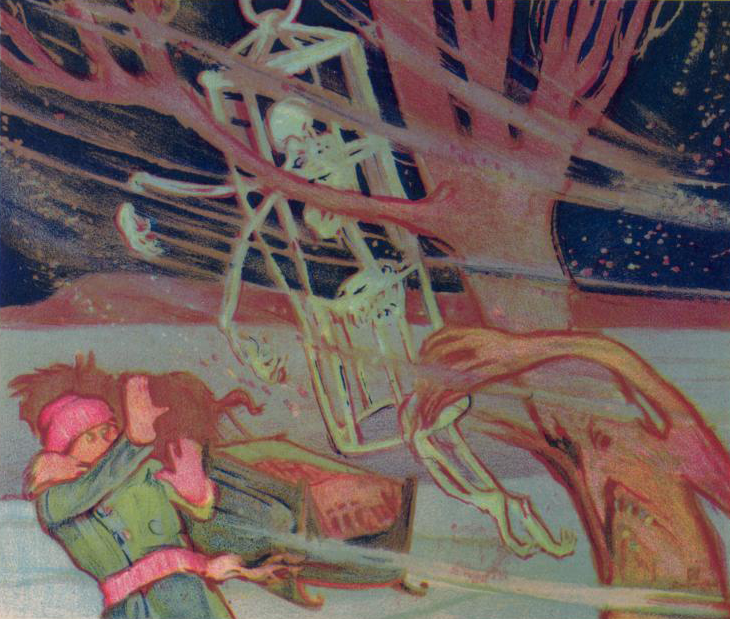
The skeleton of La Corriveau, in her iron cage, terrifying a traveller, 1926

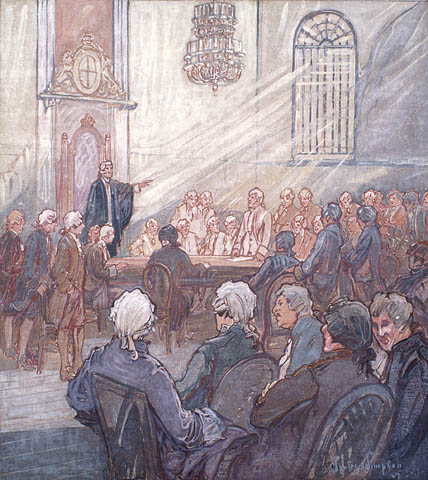
Lower Canada Legislative Assembly in 1792 (Chapel of Bishop's Palace, Quebec City), 1927

== See also ==
- Canadian official war artists
- War artist
- War art
