= Terence Michael Shortt =

Canadian artist-ornithologist (1911-1986)

- Born: 1 March 1911; Winnipeg, Manitoba
- Died: 28 December 1986 (aged 75); Toronto, Ontario
- Known for: artist-ornithologist
- Spouse: Audrey Bell (m. 1939)

Terence Michael Shortt (March 1, 1911 – December 28, 1986) was one of Canada's most distinguished ornithologist artists. He dedicated his life to the depiction of birds in their natural surroundings and influenced many others, including Robert Bateman and J. Fenwick Lansdowne.

He worked at the Royal Ontario Museum (ROM) from 1930 to 1976 (from 1933 as an artist-ornithologist) and was made in charge of display from 1948 on which accounts for the accuracy of the ROM's dioramas and exhibits. Shortt led more than 30 expeditions to Alaska, Mexico, the Galapagos, India and East Africa.

== Work ==
Shortt was born in Winnipeg and attended the Winnipeg School of Art (1928–1930), studying with LeMoine FitzGerald and R. Keith Gebhart. He travelled to the Arctic on RMS SS Nascopie in 1938 as the resident ornithologist and shared a cabin with Frederick Varley for three months. Varley coached him on painting, stressing he should be more of an artist than a scientist. He began to work for the Royal Ontario Museum in Toronto in 1930 as a field artist and gallery assistant. In 1933, he became artist-ornithologist for the museum. His career there spanned 46 years. In 1948, he became Chief of Art and Exhibits (Zoology) and in 1959, head of the Biology display. He created many world-class dioramas for the museum as well as leading many expeditions to places such as Galapagos, India and East Africa to gather specimens. He retired in 1976 as Head Artist.

He had numerous exhibitions of his work, among them a retrospective in 1977 with over 100 works, organized and circulated by the Robert McLaughlin Gallery in Oshawa along with Pagurian Press.

Shortt was a member of the Brodie Club (from 1931 on), and a member of the American Ornithologists Union from 1931. He was elected a life member of the Union in 1943. He also was elected a member of the Explorers Club of New York.

The Terence Michael Shortt Field notebooks, illustrations and photographs are in the Academy of Natural Sciences Archives, Drexel University, Philadelphia (ANSP-Coll-0805).

== Works ==
=== Books ===
Shortt illustrated over 20 books He was the author of several, listed below:

- Wild Birds of Canada and the Americas (Toronto : Pagurian Press for J. Wiley, 1977), ISBN 0889320578
- Wild Birds of the Americas (Publisher: Houghton Mifflin, ISBN 9780395257869), 1977
- Not as the Crow Flies (ISBN 9780771081675), 1975 (Shortt's autobiography)
