= Edward Zuber =

Canadian artist (1932–2018)

- Born: May 7, 1932; Montreal, Quebec, Canada
- Died: October 30, 2018 (aged 86); Kingston, Ontario, Canada
- Known for: painter

Edward Fenwick Zuber (May 7, 1932 – October 30, 2018) was a Canadian artist.

== Early life ==
Edward Fenwick Zuber was born on May 7, 1932, in Montreal, Quebec. He first studied art at the École des Beaux-Arts de Montréal, attended Queen's University (fine arts). He served an apprenticeship with Matthew Martirano.

== Military service in Korea ==
At the outbreak of the Korean War in 1950, Zuber enlisted. He was a parachutist with the 1st Battalion, The Royal Canadian Regiment. He traveled with his battalion's to Korea in 1952; and he was wounded in action. and was evacuated to the Norwegian M.A.S.H. and the 25th Canadian Field Hospital.

Throughout his experience on the Korean front, Zuber produced many drawings and maintained a detailed "Sketch diary". Paintings created after his return to Canada are informed by Zuber's frontline notebooks and experiences. Thirteen of these canvases are in the collections of the Canadian War Museum.

During the Korean War, no official war artist was designated by Canada's military.

== War artist ==
When the Gulf War began, the experience of Canadian forces during "Operation Friction" was captured by the Canadian Armed Forces Civilian Artists Program (CAFCAP). Zuber was selected from among a field of other applicants; and during his time in Qatar, he was recognized as an "official war artist."

Zuber served in the Gulf War Theatre from January 21 to March 3, 1991, as Canada's Official War Artist.

== Death ==
Edward Zuber died on October 30, 2018, at the age of 86.

== Honours ==
Zuber is the only Canadian service man or woman to have both the Korean War medal and the Gulf War medal.

- November 11, 1991 — awarded the Korean Medal along with the other Canadians who served in Korea.
- December 17, 1991 — awarded the Kuwait and Gulf medal by Chief of the Defense Staff, General John de Chastelain.

== See also ==
- Canadian official war artists
- War artist
- War art
