= Donald Cameron Mackay =

Canadian artist (1906–1979)

Donald Cameron Mackay FRSC
- Born: March 30, 1906; Fredericton, New Brunswick
- Died: November 15, 1979 (aged 73); Halifax, NS
- Education: Halifax Academy; Dalhousie University; the Nova Scotia College of Art (graduated 1928); Chelsea School of Art in London, England; the Académie Colarossi in Paris; and the University of Toronto
- Known for: Maritime artist; Official War Artist for the Navy; author and illustrator
- Spouse(s): Alice Mary "Mollie" Bell (m. August 29, 1934); Margaret MacNeil (m. August 16,1966)
- Children: Margaret Bell "Margot" Mackay (1942- )

Donald Cameron Mackay FRSC (1906–1979) was a Maritime artist; an Official War Artist for the Royal Navy of Canada; an author and illustrator.

== Career ==
Mackay was born in Fredericton, New Brunswick. In 1912, he moved with his family to Nova Scotia. His major training as an artist took place at the Nova Scotia College of Art (today NASCAD) with Henry Mortikar Rosenberg, graduating in 1928. In 1929, Mackay did graduate studies at the Chelsea School of Art in London, England, where, among his other teachers was Graham Sutherland. He then studied in France at the Académie Colarossi in Paris and at Heatherley's School of Art in London. In 1930, he moved to Toronto, Ontario, where he worked as an illustrator and studied at the University of Toronto extension department with Arthur Lismer. In Toronto, Mackay became a teacher at Northern Vocational School and at the Art Gallery of Toronto (now the Art Gallery of Ontario).

In 1934, he married and together with his wife, returned to Halifax, where he began work as an instructor and later as vice-principal at NASCAD. Besides his job at the College, Mackay was employed as a lecturer at Dalhousie University.

Already in the Royal Canadian Navy Volunteer Reserve, Mackay entered active service in 1939 as a lieutenant. While primarily employed in the Intelligence Branch, Mackay did drawing, painting and camouflage at sea. From 1943, to 1944, he worked as an Official War Artist for the Navy, painting on Newfoundland's east coast and retiring from the Navy in 1945.

In 1951, he became principal at NASCAD, retiring in 1971. In 1951 his four murals were installed in the Halifax Memorial Library's main floor. They are in tribute to the Navy, Army, Air Force and Merchant Navy. Mackay also was a writer and an expert on old silver and heraldry. He was co-author and illustrator of "Master Goldsmiths and Silversmiths of Nova Scotia" (with Harry Piers, 1948); and author of "Silversmiths and Related Craftsmen of the Atlantic Provinces" (1973). He illustrated many books and periodicals as well. He died in Halifax in 1979.

An exhibition of his drawings, etchings, watercolours, and sketchbooks are in the collection of the Dalhousie University Archives. A show of these works was organized by curated by Gemey Kelly for the Dalhousie University Art Gallery in 1989.

== Memberships ==
Mackay was a member of many societies and served on many boards such as the Nova Scotia Society of Artists (1931); The Artists' Society of London (Eng., 1931); The Canadian Society of Graphic Art (1955); Maritime Art Association (1937); Nova Scotia Museum of Fine Art (1936); the Canadian Society for Education through Art; Fellow, Royal Society of Arts (1955); and Canada Arts Council.

== Selected public collections ==
He is represented in the collections of the Canadian War Museum; New York Public Library; N.S. Museum of Fine Arts; Art of the Western Hemisphere Collection (New York); Dalhousie University and other public collections.

== Honours ==
Among his awards he received a Silver Medal from the Royal Institute of Canadian Architects; "Allied Arts Medal" (1955), was made a Fellow, Royal Society of Arts (1955); and he received a Canada Council Fellowship, and a Visitor's Grant from the British Council.
