= J. W. Beatty =

Canadian painter (1869–1941)

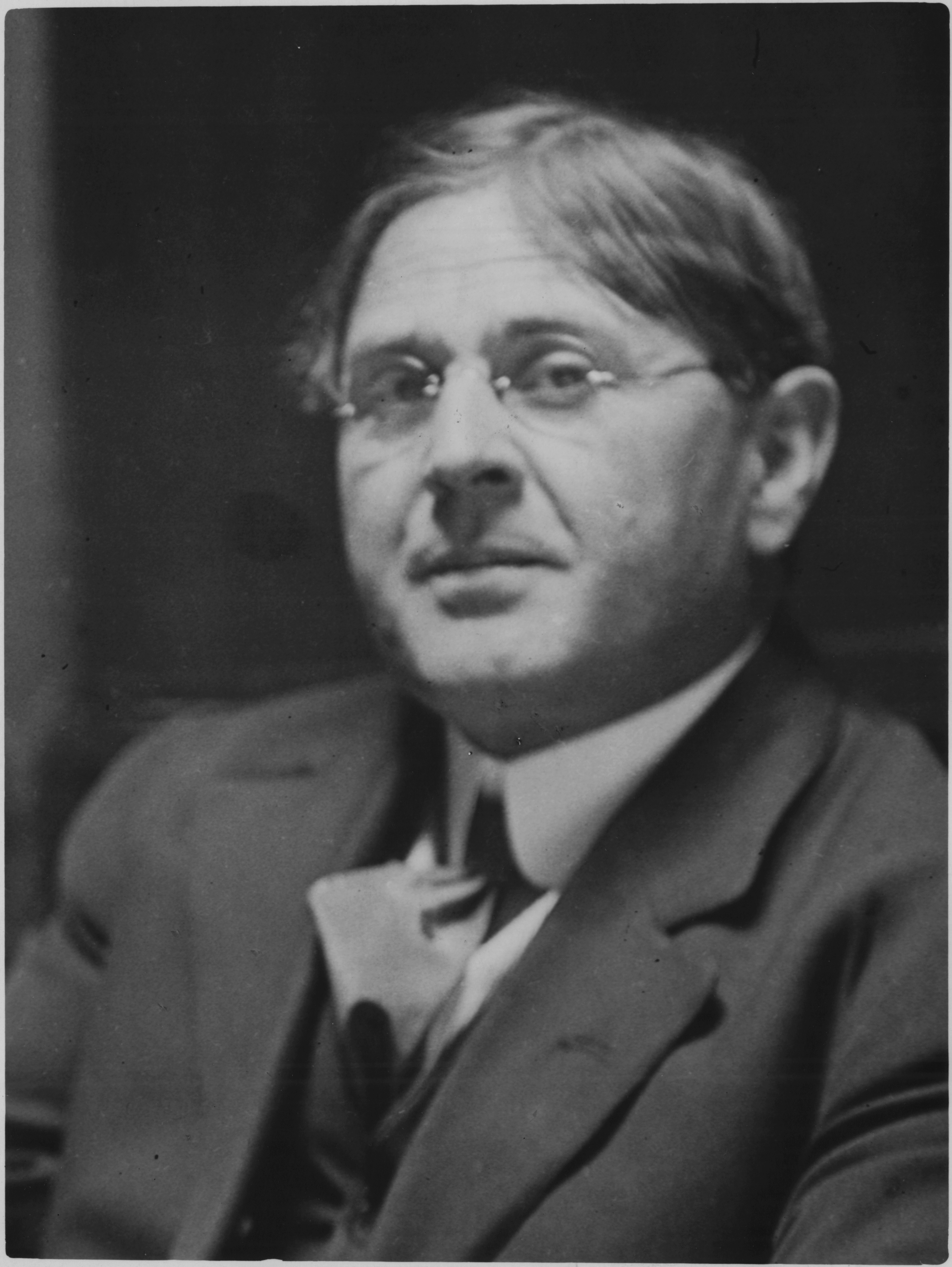
- Born: John William Beatty; May 30, 1869; Toronto, Ontario, Canada
- Died: October 4, 1941 (aged 72); Toronto, Ontario
- Education: Central Ontario School of Art and Design, Toronto (1894); Académie Julian, Paris (1900); London Chelsea Polytechnic, London, England (1906)
- Known for: painter, teacher at Ontario College of Art (1912-1941)
- Spouse: Caroline Cornock
- Elected: Royal Canadian Academy of Arts, Associate member (1903), Full member(1913); Ontario Society of Artists (1901); Arts and Letters Club, President (1912-1913)

J. W. Beatty RCA (in full, John William Beatty) (1869–1941) was a Canadian painter who was a forerunner in the movement which became the Group of Seven in 1920.

== Early painting life ==
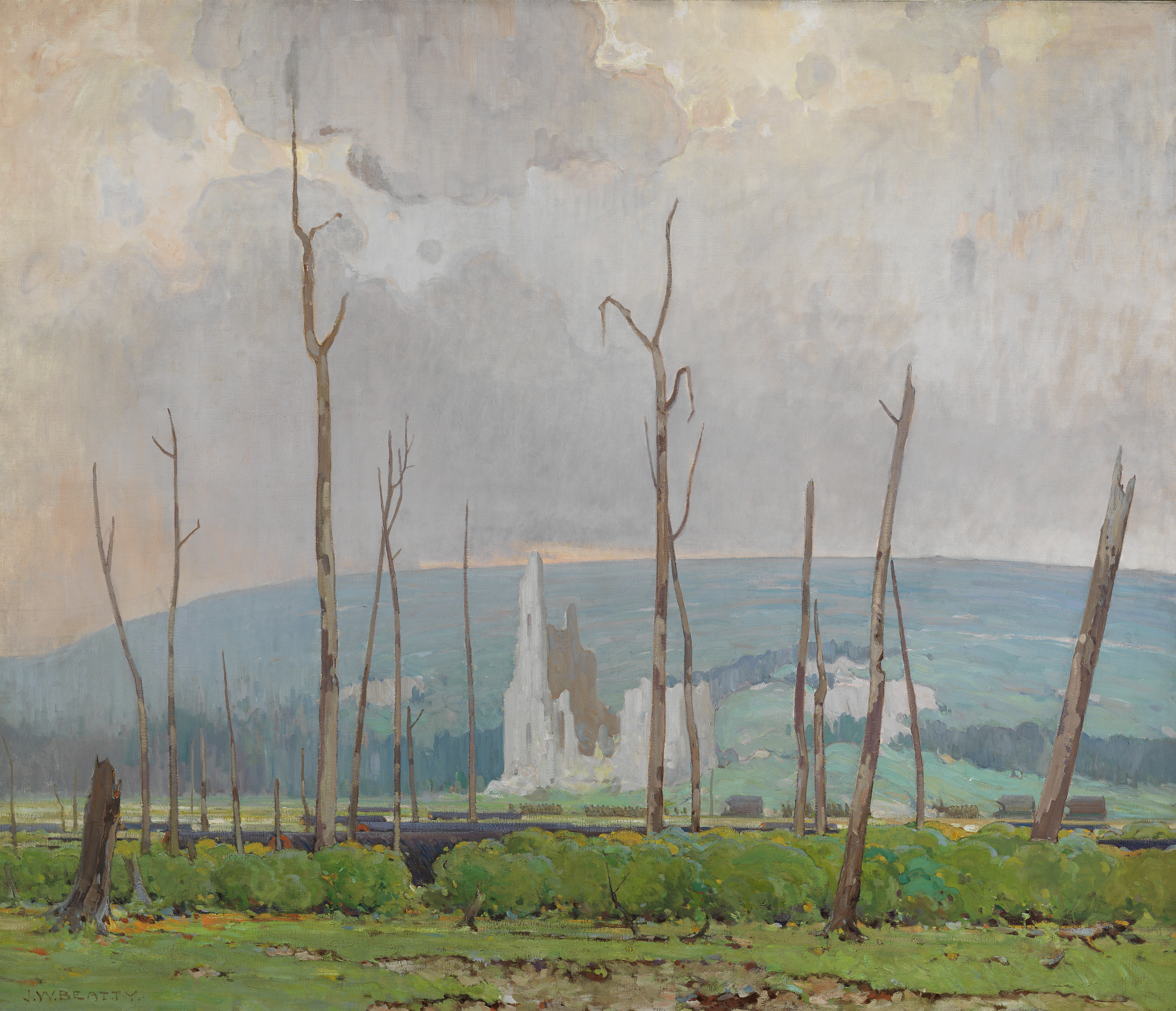
Ablain-St. Nazaire by Beatty in the collection of the Canadian War Museum.

Beatty was born on May 30, 1869, and went to school in Toronto, Ontario. He was a member of the volunteers who served in the North-West Rebellion in 1885, then worked in the Toronto Fire Department (1869–1900). In his leisure time, he studied art with George Agnew Reid and other teachers. In 1900, he studied at the Académie Julian in Paris with Jean-Paul Laurens and Benjamin Constant. He travelled throughout Europe from 1906 to 1909, painted at the Académie Julian and Académie Colarossi, and travelled to London where he attended the London Chelsea Polytechnic. He made trips to Holland, Belgium and other places to sketch and worked up the sketches when he returned home into many dark, rich, moody paintings of Dutch peasant life and other subjects. From 1912 to 1941, he worked at the Ontario College of Art. Over time, his work changed to more vibrant tones.

Paintings of Algonquin Park were becoming a theme of Canadian painters in the early years of the Twentieth century. In 1909, the year he returned to Canada, he went to the park in order to paint Canadian landscape themes. He painted The Evening Cloud of the Northland in 1910, a view of a forest fire burning in distant hills. Beatty felt that this work represented Canada much better than his previous work called A Dutch Peasant, so he asked the National Gallery if they would exchange the two because, as he explained, "I am a Canadian. I would much rather be represented by a Canadian picture." The Evening Cloud of the Northland is considered a masterpiece and is in the collection of the National Gallery of Canada.

== Influences ==
Beatty shared common interests and feelings with his friends, Lawren Harris, A.Y. Jackson, Tom Thomson, and Arthur Lismer, several of whom later became members of the Group of Seven. In 1917, he worked as an Official War Artist with Frederick Varley, Maurice Cullen, and Charles Walter Simpson for the Canadian Expeditionary Force but became aghast at the destructive power of modern warfare.

== Public collections ==
- Art Gallery of Ontario, Toronto
- Art Museum at the University of Toronto
- Government of Ontario Art Collection, Toronto;
- National Gallery of Canada, Ottawa

== Honours ==
- Royal Canadian Academy of Arts

== See also ==
- Canadian official war artists
- War artist
- Military art

== Bibliography ==
- Farr, Dorothy (1981). J.W. Beatty, 1869-1941. Agnes Etherington Art Gallery ISBN 0889110182
- MacDonald, Colin S. (1967). A Dictionary of Canadian Artists, volume I: A-F (first ed.). Ottawa: Canadian Paperbacks Publishing Ltd. Archived from the original on June 7, 2020.
- Reid, Dennis R. (1988). A Concise History of Canadian Painting. Toronto: Oxford University Press. ISBN 9780195406641; ISBN 978-0-19-540663-4; OCLC 18378555
