= Gertrude Kearns =

Canadian contemporary war artist

Gertrude Steiger Kearns CM (born 1950) is a Canadian contemporary war artist.

== Early life ==
Kearns was born in 1950 to father Frederic Steiger in Toronto, Ontario.

== Career ==
Inspired by the Gulf War, Kearns began drawing war art with a focus on military experiences in Somalia and Rwanda. By 1997, the War Museum housed two of her paintings of Kyle Brown and later accepted her MacKenzie and Dallaire portraits. In 2003, Kearns was one of the chosen artists sent to Afghanistan under the Canadian Forces Artists Program. Upon her return, Kearns completed a three-panel painting titled "What They Gave," which included an image of three wounded men in hospital settings.

“War can be very direct and blunt, but (Kearns’s) work has levels of nuance and subtlety that really make one step back and think hard as to what she is trying to say through her art.”

— Retired Lieutenant-General Andrew Leslie on Kearns' portrait Gen Andrew Leslie, Science of War.

In 2005, two of her art pieces depicting Canadian soldiers, specifically Kyle Brown, torturing Shidane Arone, were displayed at the Canadian War Museum. As a result, boycotts arose from Clifford Chadderton and National Council of Veterans Associations who did not want such contents on display. She also created an exhibition of painting regarding John Bentley Mays to display "psychological conflict and the transitory nature of resolution in the face of intellect and depression." Kearns eventually compiled her Afghan war art into an exhibit titled "The Art of Command: Portraits and Posters from Canada's Afghan Mission." From December 2005 until January 2006, Kearns was commissioned to stay with Canadian soldiers in Kandahar and create five paintings from that experience.

In 2008, Kearns was commissioned to paint Tecumseh and Brock, the Shawnee Indian leader and British major-general who fought in the War of 1812. By 2011, Kearns was working on creating 24 war posters, specifically images of prominent Canadian soldiers. Despite the willingness of the Canadian military to accept her work, Kearns found that commercial galleries were unwilling to display her art for not being “subversive enough.”

In 2015, the Fort York Visitor Centre displayed Kearns military art exhibit "The Art of Command: Portraits and Posters from Canada’s Afghan Mission." In 2019, Kearns was named a Member of the Order of Canada. In 2024 four of her works were included in Outside the Lines, an exhibition by the Canadian War Museum. One was The Dilemma of Kyle Brown: Paradox in the Beyond (1995), which showed a Canadian soldier involved in the torture death of a Somali citizen caught stealing from a Canadian base.
