= Eric Aldwinckle =

Canadian artist (1909–1980)

- Born: Eric Aldwinckle; 22 January 1909; Oxford, United Kingdom
- Died: 13 January 1980 (aged 70); Toronto, Dominion of Canada
- Education: Self-taught
- Known for: painter, muralist, graphic artist; teacher at the Ontario College of Art, 1936–42; Principal of New School of Design and Vice-Principal of the Ontario College of Art, 1946
- Notable work: Great Seal of Canada
- Elected: Royal Canadian Academy of Arts; Ontario Society of Artists; Canadian Society of Graphic Art

Eric Aldwinckle RCA (22 January 1909 – 13 January 1980) was an Official Second World War artist, designer and one of the most prominent illustrators of the 20th century. He was also a teacher at the Ontario College of Art, 1936–1942; Principal of New School of Design and Vice-Principal of the Ontario College of Art, 1946. His works include the current Great Seal of Canada, adopted in 1955.

== Biography ==
World War II-era poster by Eric Aldwinckle in the collection of the National Archives of the United States

Born in the UK, Aldwinckle immigrated to the Dominion of Canada in his teens. He apprenticed with printers in Toronto in the 1920s and learned the graphic design trade along the way. He struck out on his own in 1930, and built a successful design practice on corporate work and illustration, including several covers for Maclean's and illustrating for Mayfair magazine. During this period he was active in Toronto's Arts and Letters Club, where in 1938 Bertram Brooker asked him to design the cover of the new issue of its publication The Lamps, which he was editing. Aldwinckle was also a regular part-time instructor at the Ontario College of Art.

In World War II he registered as a conscientious objector, and created several well-known war posters, then became a camouflage designer in Halifax, Nova Scotia. In late 1942 he heard that Ottawa was looking for volunteers for its new War Artist program. He applied and was accepted, receiving a commission in the Royal Canadian Air Force. He attained the rank of Flight Lieutenant while covering RCAF operations in Coastal Command and the 2nd Tactical Air Force. During the years 1943-6 he produced over one hundred drawings and paintings in watercolours and oils that remain the property of The Crown and reside permanently with the Canadian War Museum.

== Career ==
He returned to his Toronto design practice in late 1945. When Frank Carmichael died suddenly he found himself in charge of the Ontario College of Art`s New School of Design. Educational administration was not for him and he resigned in 1946. In 1948, he created several covers and inside drawings for the Varsity Graduate magazine. He then worked as Graphic Arts Designer for the University of Toronto from 1948 to 1953. His celebrity as a returned war artist helped him land high-profile mural commissions with the Sunnybrook Hospital and Ontario Hydro. In 1961 he designed the coat of arms for the newly founded York University.

In 1954, along with Frederick Varley and others, he visited the Soviet Union on the first Canadian cultural exchange of the Cold War, and their travels were documented in a Maclean's article. Although he was never a communist and undertook this visit out of curiosity, it is likely that this visit made him ideologically 'suspect' and may have adversely affected his career from this point forward.

As a mature designer, he continued to work steadily during the 1950s, counting as his clients Imperial Oil, the University of Toronto, Ryerson, York University and the Stratford Festival. He was not a prolific fine artist, however, which guaranteed him a low profile in comparison to other war artists, such as Alex Colville, Lawren P. Harris or Jack Shadbolt.

Aldwinckle was an out-of-the-box thinker decades before the term became popular. He was a student of Theosophy (his book Two Fables was published by the Theosophical Press in 1950), an accomplished chef, raconteur, astrologer, composer of music, playwright, writer, and social critic. He enjoyed mentoring young artists, and influenced the careers of the late composer Harry Somers (his correspondence with Somers is in the McMaster University Archives, RC0385), Academy Award-winning filmmaker Christopher Chapman, muralist York Wilson and designer Theo Dimson.

He also played a role in the establishment of Killarney Provincial Park, an area later associated with paintings by members of the Group of Seven.

== Honour ==
- Royal Canadian Academy of Arts

== Bibliography ==
- Horn, Michiel (2009). York University: The Way Must Be Tried. Montreal: McGill-Queen's University Press. ISBN 9780773534162. JSTOR j.ctt80266.
- LeBlanc, Michael (2016). Nothing Uninteresting The Work and Life of Eric Aldwinckle. Blurb, 2016. ISBN 9781367458697.
- MacDonald, Colin (1967). A Dictionary of Canadian Artists (First ed.). Ottawa: Canadian Paperbacks Publishing. ISBN 0919554113.
- McBurney, Margaret (2007). The Great Adventure: 100 Years of the Arts and Letters Club. Toronto: Arts and Letters Club of Toronto. ISBN 9780969458821.
- "What two Canadian Artists saw in Russia, October 1, 1954". archive.macleans.ca. Maclean's. Archived from the original on 6 July 2020.
