= Charles Goldhamer =

Canadian artist (1903–1985)

- Born: Charles Goldhamer; August 21, 1903; Philadelphia, Pennsylvania, United States
- Died: January 27, 1985 (aged 81); Toronto, Ontario, Canada
- Education: Ontario College of Art
- Occupations: Administrator, teacher, painter
- Spouse: Anna Russell (m. 1948)

Charles Goldhamer (August 21, 1903 – January 27, 1985) was an American-born Canadian artist. He is mostly known for his work as a Canadian Official War Artist during the 1940s.

== Life and family ==
Goldhamer was born in Philadelphia, Pennsylvania and came to Canada with his family the following year, first settling in Owen Sound, Ontario and later Toronto. Goldhamer produced art for Eaton's advertising pages and drew a regular cartoon for the Star Weekly. He continued his education at the Ontario College of Art, studying with Arthur Lismer (1922-1926).

In 1926, he taught at the Ontario College of Art and from 1928 on at the Central Technical School, in time serving as the chairman of the art department, and retiring in 1969, after working there forty-two years. In 1948, he married the English-born performer Anna Russell; they divorced in 1954. He died in Toronto of an apparent heart attack at the age of 81.

== Art career ==
Goldhamer exhibited with the Royal Canadian Academy of Arts (1928–1939), the Ontario Society of Artists (1930–1939) (life member), the Canadian Society of Painters in Water Colour (1930–39) and the Canadian Society of Graphic Art (1928–1939) and was a member of the Society of Canadian Painter-Etchers and Engravers and life member of The Arts and Letters Club of Toronto. He was president of the Canadian Society of Painters in Water Colour from 1941 to 1943.

A number of his watercolours appeared in the show A Century of Canadian Art at the Tate in London in 1938. In 1939, he showed watercolours of boats as well as drawings and lithographs at the Picture Loan Society in Toronto. The Toronto Star called it "the finest show of waterside watercolours ever seen here" and a "revelation of colour and form" while Saturday Night described the show as workmanlike and honest.

Goldhamer served overseas with the Royal Canadian Air Force as an official Canadian war artist from 1943 to 1946. He was appointed the supervisor of art programs for air force personnel, and was involved in an arts and crafts rehabilitation program in Newfoundland and Labrador and later on the West coast. While in the armed services, he wrote and illustrated a booklet titled Drawing for pleasure in a series called How-To-Get-Started. He went overseas in the final stages of the war. In 1945, he made charcoal drawings of surgery patients at the Queen Victoria Hospital (formerly the R.C.A.F. Plastic Surgery Hospital) at East Grinstead, Sussex, a hospital with among its services, the severely burned. He regarded these studies of airmen as "studies in character".

In 1954, Paul Duval selected his watercolour of Fishing Boats, Atlantic Coast, for his book, Canadian Water Colour Painting. Duval wrote of Goldhamer that his early work was of habitants and scenes along the Atlantic coast but more recently he had developed a fresh vein of landscape fantasy. In 1982, a retrospective of his work was held in Toronto at The Arts and Letters Club. In 1985, an exhibition of watercolors he had painted from 1935 to 1944, of the artisans in Baie-Saint-Paul, organized by The Robert McLaughlin Gallery, was shown in Baie-Saint-Paul.

His works are held in the collections of the Canadian War Museum, The Robert McLaughlin Gallery, Oshawa, the National Gallery of Canada, the Art Gallery of Ontario and Hart House at the University of Toronto.
