= Frederick Varley =

Member of the Canadian Group of Seven

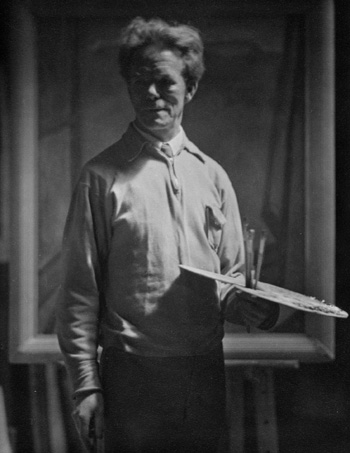
- Born: Frederick Horsman Varley; 2 January 1881; Sheffield, England
- Died: 8 September 1969 (aged 88); Markham, Ontario, Canada
- Known for: Painter
- Movement: Group of Seven
- Spouse: Maud Pinder (m. 1908)

Frederick Horsman Varley (2 January 1881 – 8 September 1969) was a member of the Canadian Group of Seven and the main portraitist of the Group.

== Career ==
=== Early life ===
Varley was born in Sheffield, England, in 1881, the son of Lucy Barstow and Samuel James Smith Varley the 7th. He began his art training there in 1892, at the age of 11, studied art in Sheffield (1892–1899) and attended the Académie Royale des Beaux-Arts in Antwerp (1900–1902), Belgium, while he worked on the docks. He emigrated to Canada in 1912 on the advice of another Sheffield native (and future Group of Seven member), Arthur Lismer, and found work at the Grip Ltd. design firm in Toronto, Ontario and afterwards at Rous & Mann.

=== War artist ===
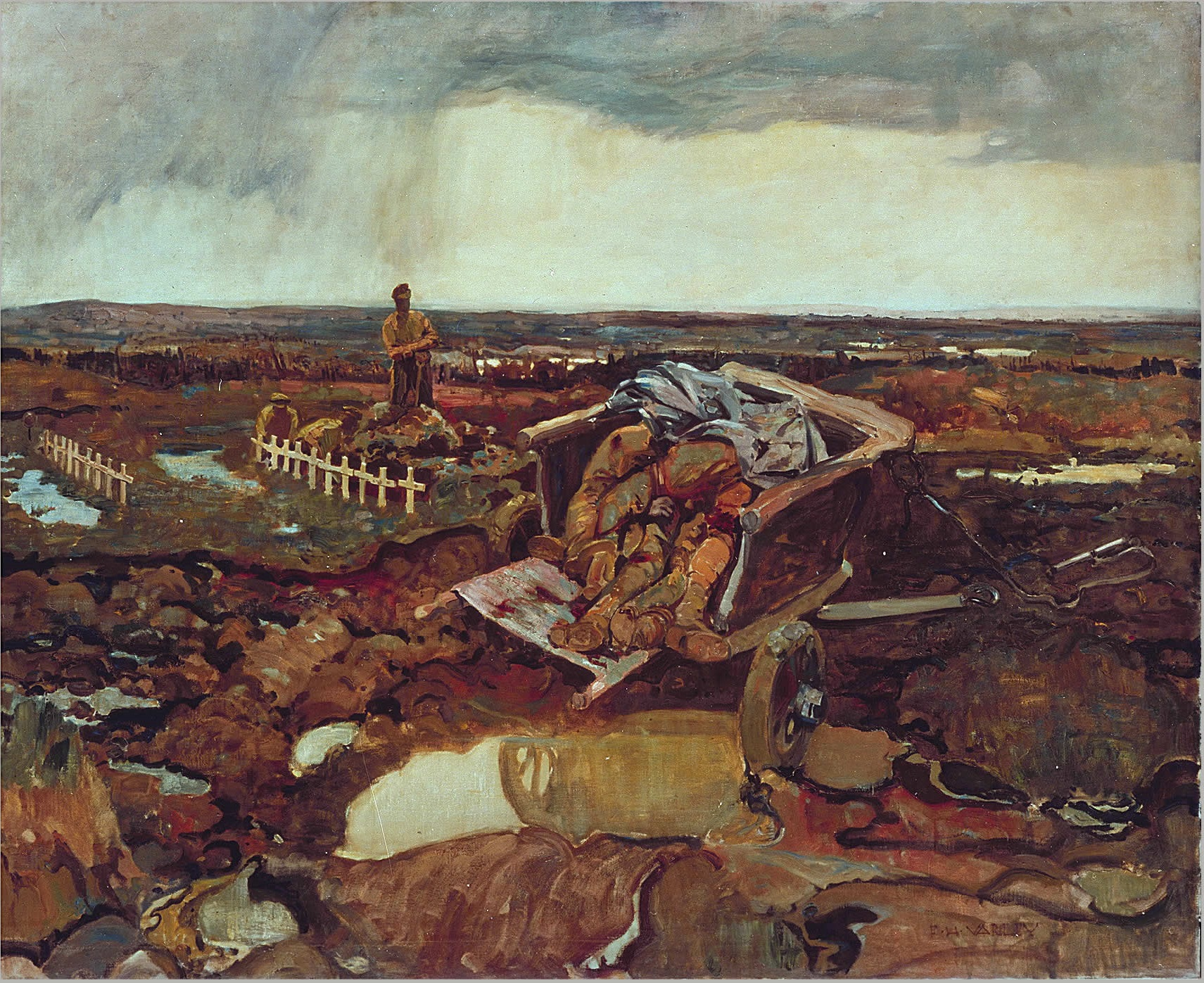
The painting For What? completed by Varley while an official war artist

Beginning in January 1918, he served in the First World War with C.W. Simpson, J.W. Beatty and Maurice Cullen. Varley came to the attention of Lord Beaverbrook, who arranged for him to be commissioned as an official war artist. He accompanied Canadian troops in the Hundred Days offensive from Amiens, France to Mons, Belgium. His paintings of combat are based on his experiences at the front. Although he had been enthusiastic to travel to France as a war artist, he became deeply disturbed by what he saw, saying:

We’d be healthier to forget [the war], and that we never can. We are forever tainted with its abortiveness and its cruel drama.

Varley's Some Day the People Will Return, shown at Burlington House in London and at the Canadian War Memorials Exhibition, is a large canvas depicting a war-ravaged cemetery, suggesting that even the dead cannot escape the destruction.

In Varley's painting For What? (1918), a single gravedigger takes a rest from his labours, a cart full of bodies beside him. It is one of the few official Canadian First World War paintings that does not hide the reality of battlefield death in images of ruins, blasted trees, and battle detritus.

=== Group of Seven ===
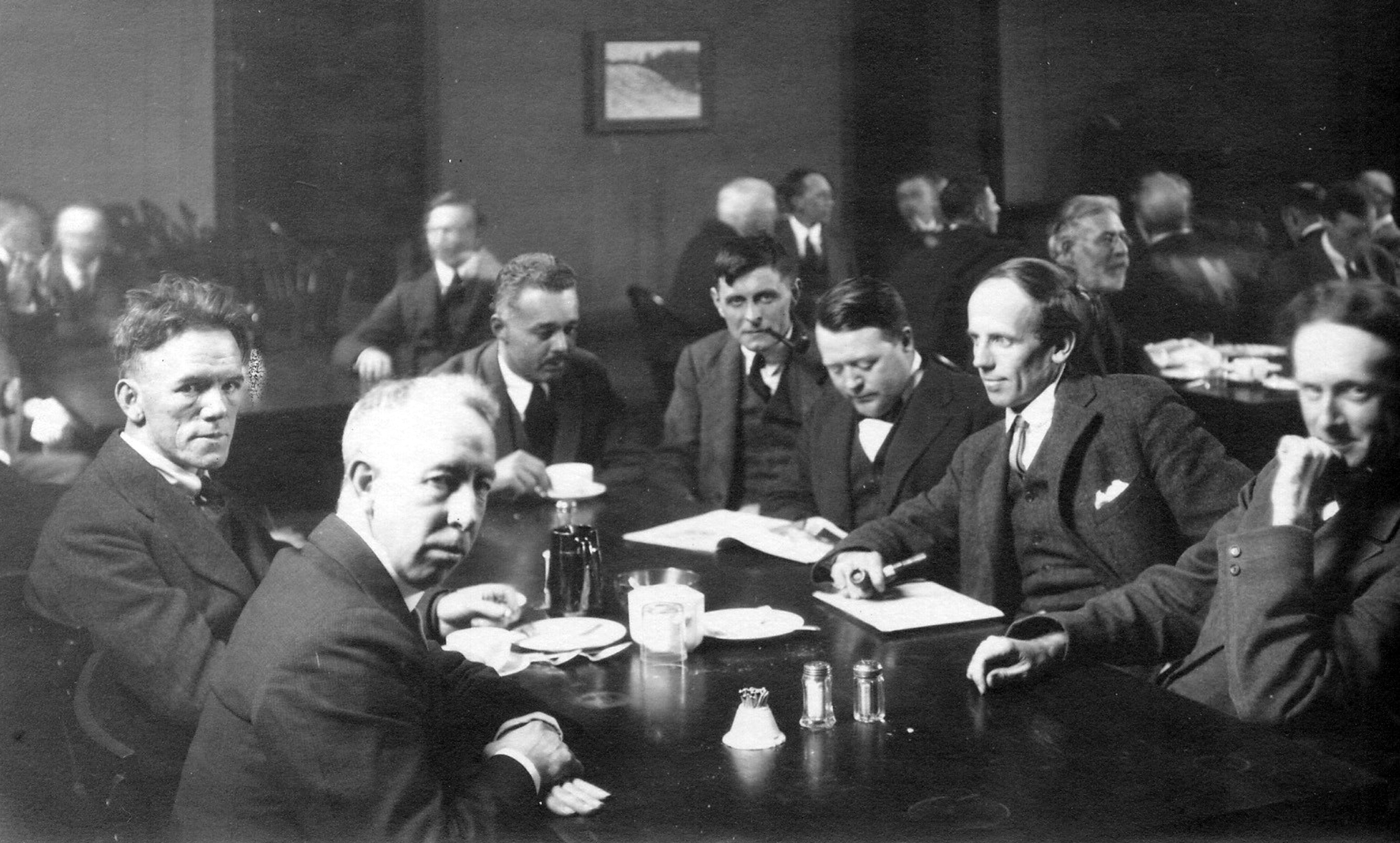
The Group of seven artists

In 1920, he was a founding member of the Group of Seven. He was the only original member of the Group of Seven to specialize in portraiture, but he also painted landscapes. Varley's major contribution to art is his work with the Group of Seven and his portraits.

=== Later life and death ===
After living in Ontario for a number of years, Varley moved to Vancouver, British Columbia, in 1926 where he became Head of the Department of Drawing and Painting at the School of Decorative and Applied Arts in Vancouver at the invitation of Charles Hepburn Scott. He remained in this position from 1926 until 1933.

In British Columbia, he painted images of mountains and mountainsides, drawing upon several influences from Chinese painting to William Turner and Samuel Palmer. He left in 1936 due to his experiences with depression, and two years later joined fellow artist Terry Shortt, the Royal Ontario Museum ornithologist, on a trip to the Arctic in 1938. In 1954, along with a handful of artists including Eric Aldwinckle, he visited the Soviet Union on the first cultural exchange of the Cold War.

For the last twelve years of his life, Varley lived in Markham, Ontario, with Kathleen and Donald McKay. Kathleen nurtured Varley’s later artistic career by setting up a studio for him in the basement of her ancestral home, now the McKay Art Centre located at 197 Main Street Unionville. After Varley’s death in 1969, Kathleen promised to donate her considerable collection of works by Varley and his contemporaries to Markham, to be housed in a gallery suitable for their display and preservation. That promise resulted in the building of the Varley Art Gallery of Markham, which opened in 1997. He was buried alongside other members of the Original Seven at the McMichael Canadian Art Collection grounds in Kleinburg, Ontario.

== Recognition ==
Varley was an associate member of the Royal Canadian Academy of Arts.

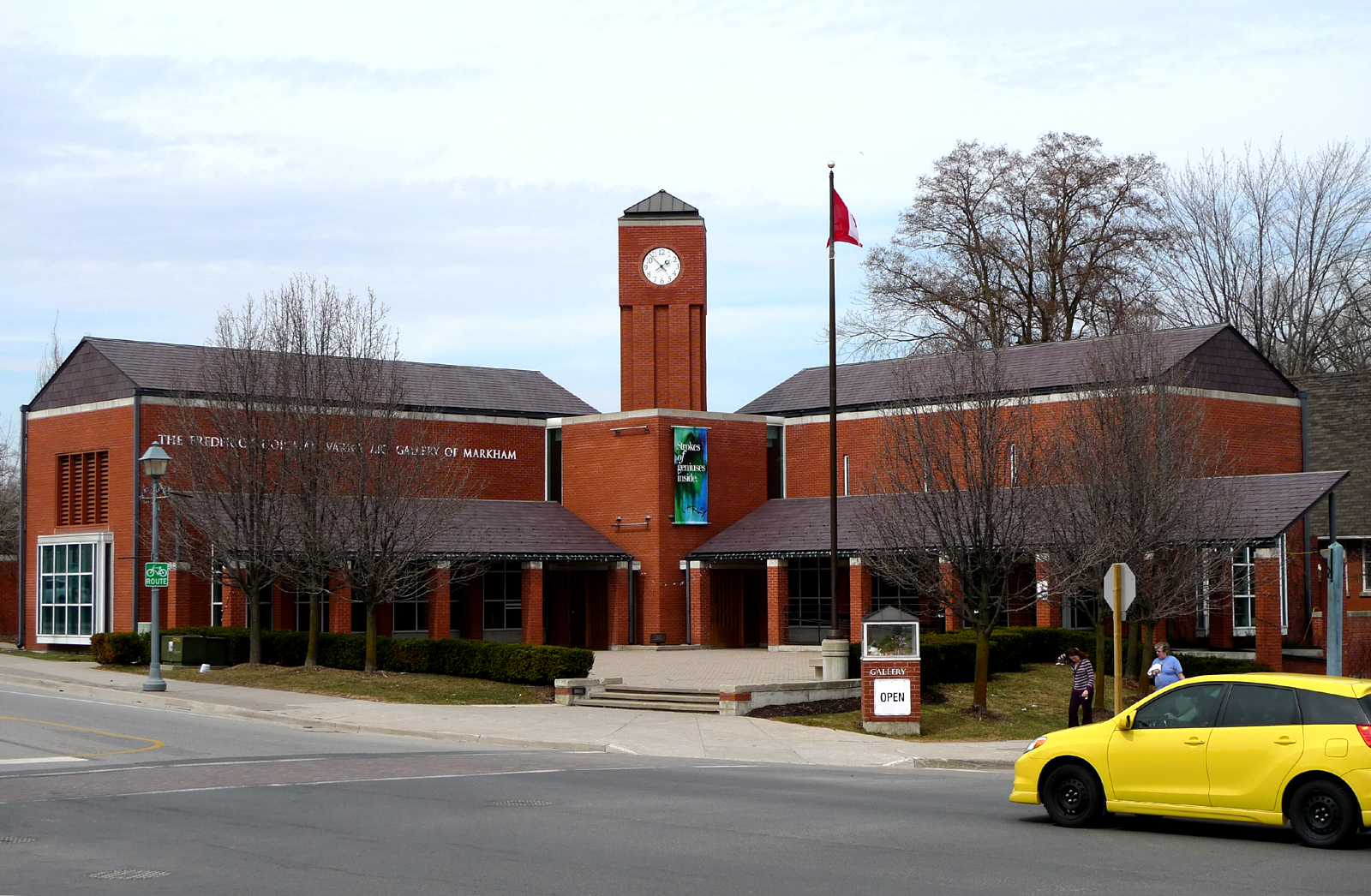
Frederick Varley Art Gallery, Unionville, Ontario

In Unionville, the Varley Art Gallery of Markham is named after him, as is Fred Varley Drive, a two-lane residential street. Varley lived nearby at the Salem-Eckhardt House from 1952 to 1969.

On 6 May 1994, Canada Post issued 'Vera (detail), F.H. Varley, 1931' in the Masterpieces of Canadian art series. The stamp was designed by Pierre-Yves Pelletier based on an oil painting Vera, (1931) by Frederick Horsman Varley in the National Gallery of Canada, Ottawa, Ontario. The 88¢ stamps are perforated 14 x 14.5 mm and were printed by Leigh-Mardon Pty Limited.

His place in the art history of Canada is verified by the government's decision to reproduce his self-portrait as a 17-cent postage stamp. On 22 May 1981, Canada Post issued 'Frederick H. Varley, Self Portrait' designed by Pierre Fontaine. The stamps are based on an oil painting Self Portrait, (circa 1945) by Frederick Horsman Varley in the Hart House Permanent Collection, University of Toronto, Toronto, Ontario. The 17¢ stamps are perforated 12.5 mm and were printed by Ashton-Potter Limited.

Varley has been designated as an Historic Person in the Directory of Federal Heritage Designations.

== Selected works ==
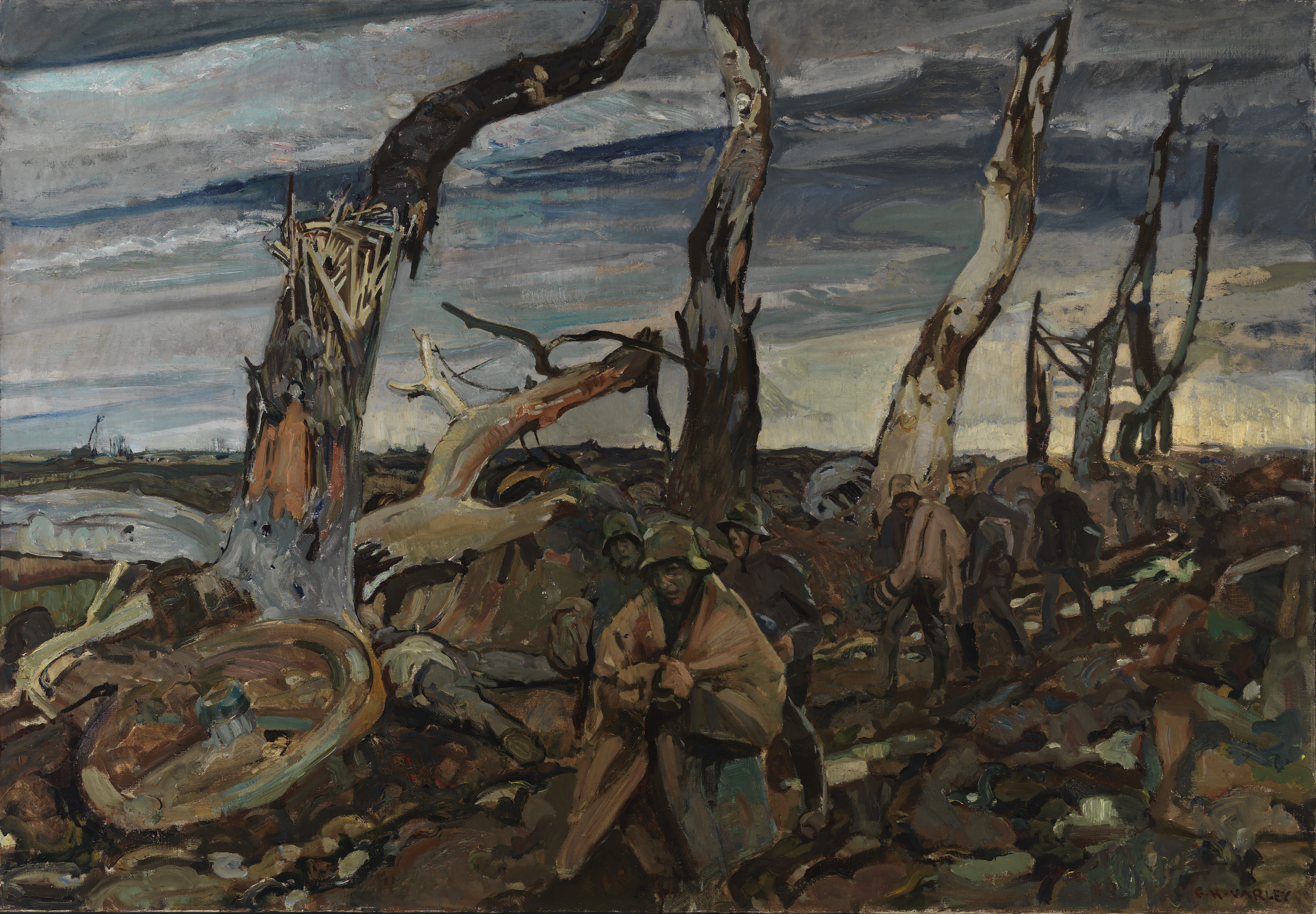
German prisoners on the Western Front.

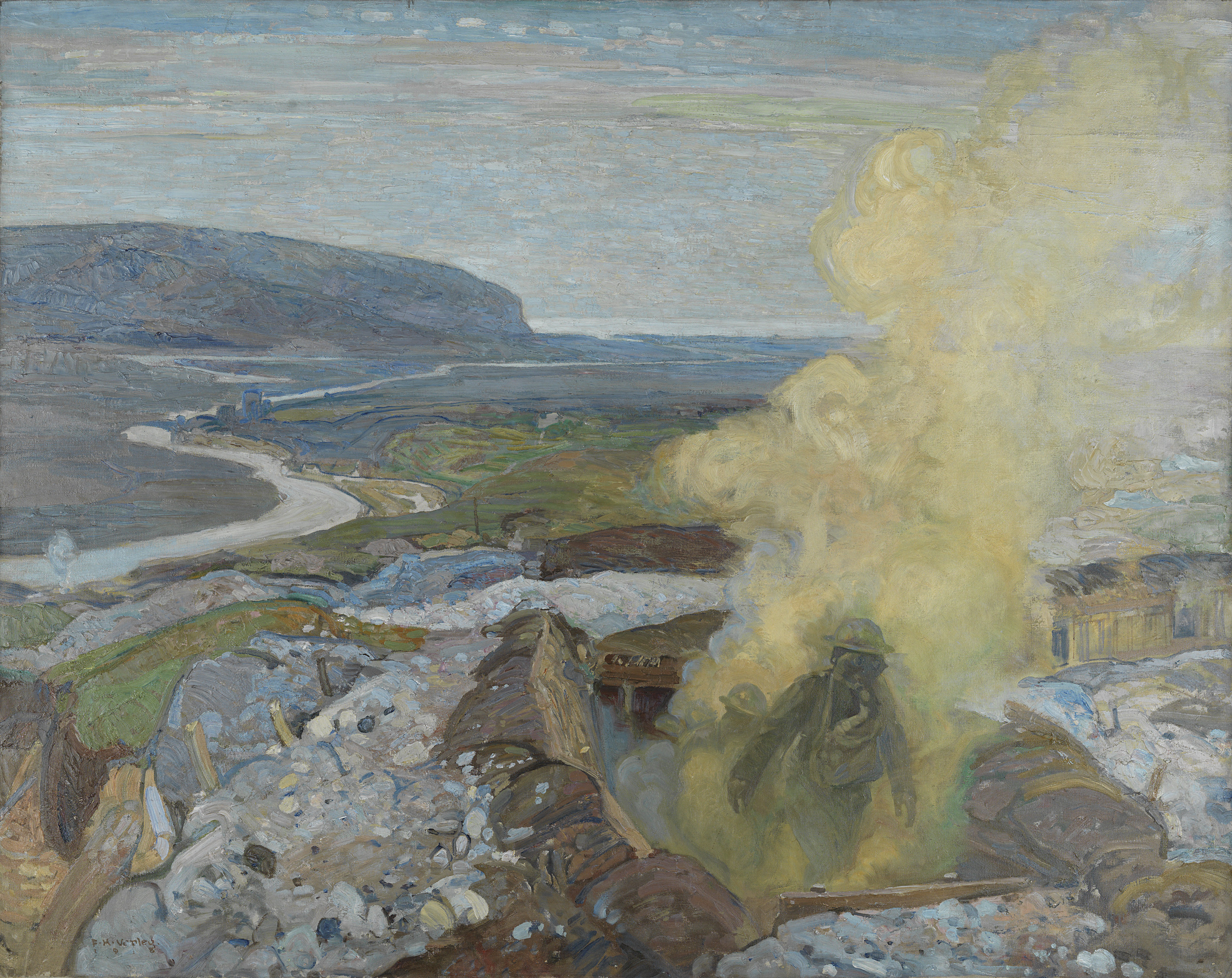
Gas chamber at Seaford

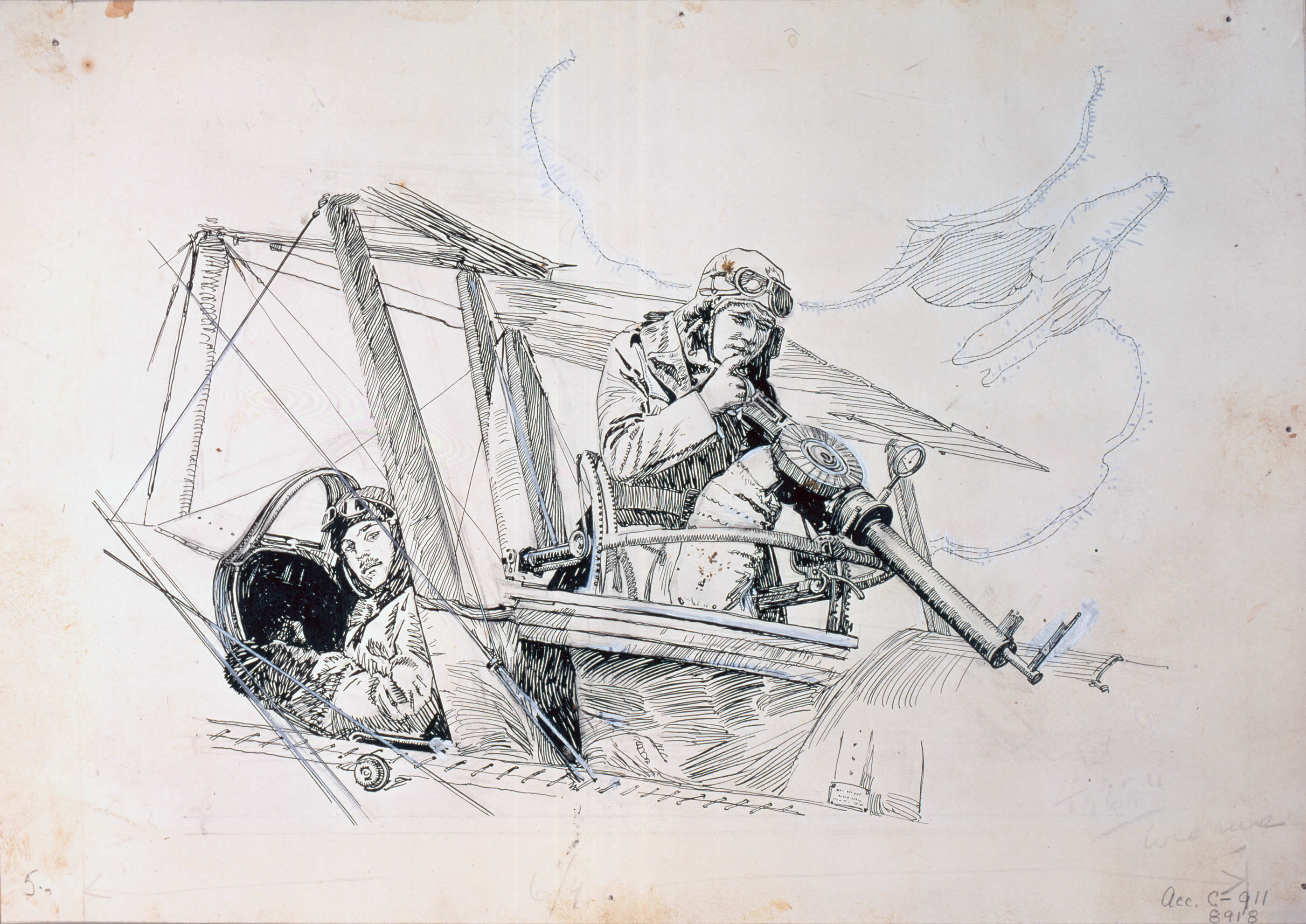
The Young Man's Element, the Air

== Record sale prices ==
At the Cowley Abbott Auction of An Important Private Collection of Canadian Art, 6 December 2023, lot 105, Varley's Sun and Wind, Georgian Bay, 1916 or 1920, oil on panel, mounted to plywood, 12.25×16.25 inches (31.1×41.3 cm), Auction Estimate: $70,000.00 – $90,000.00, realized a price of $984,000.00. At the spring Heffel auction 2026, lot 122, From Kitsilano, oil on paper on board, dated 1932 and circa 1928 – 1929 on a label by Chris Varley, inscribed "North Shore from Bayswater, Vancouver" (crossed out) and stamped with the Varley inventory #1082, 12 x 15 1/4 in, 30.5 x 38.7 cm, Estimate: $150,000 - $250,000 CAD, Sold for: $541,250 (including buyer's premium).

== See also ==
- Canadian official war artists
- Group of Seven
- Tom Thomson
- War art
- War artist

== Notes ==
=== Bibliography ===
- Atanassova, Katerina (2007). F.H. Varley: Portraits Into the Light/Mise en Lumière Des Portraits. Dundurn Press Ltd. ISBN 9781550029093.
- Boulet, Roger; Group of Seven and Tom Thomson (1982), The Canadian Earth, M. Bernard Loates, Cerebrus Publishing
- Brandon, Laura. (2008). Art and War. New York: I.B. Tauris. ISBN 9781845112370; OCLC 225345535
- Brandon, Laura. (2021). War Art in Canada: A Critical History. Toronto: Art Canada Institute, 2021. ISBN 978-1-4871-0271-5.
- Davis, Ann (1992). The logic of ecstasy: Canadian mystical painting, 1920–1940. Toronto: University of Toronto Press. ISBN 9780802059161; ISBN 9780802068613; OCLC 26256269
- Reid, Dennis R. (1988). A Concise History of Canadian Painting. Toronto: Oxford University Press. ISBN 9780195406641; ISBN 978-0-19-540663-4; OCLC 18378555
- Tooby, Michael (1991). Our Home and Native Land: Sheffield's Canadian Artists. Sheffield: Mappin Art Gallery. Archived from the original on 2 August 2023.
- Varley, Christopher (1979). F. H. Varley. Ottawa: National Gallery of Canada.
