= HMCS Annapolis =

Several Canadian naval units have been named HMCS Annapolis.

- HMCS Annapolis (I04) (I) (ex-USS MacKenzie) was a Town-class destroyer that served in the Second World War and was scrapped in 1945.
- HMCS Annapolis (DDH 265) (II) was the lead ship of the Cold War-era Annapolis-class destroyer escorts. She was scuttled to make an artificial reef in 2015.

== Battle honours ==
- Atlantic 1941–43
