= Rowley Murphy =

Canadian artist (1891–1975)

- Born: Rowley Walter Murphy; 28 May 1891; Toronto, Ontario
- Died: 1975; Toronto, Ontario
- Education: Toronto Technical School; Central Ontario School of Art and Industrial Design (today OCAD University), Toronto; Pennsylvania Academy of Fine Arts, Philadelphia
- Known for: Marine painter, illustrator, and designer of stained glass, and Official Canadian war artist

Rowley Murphy RCA (28 May 1891 – 1975) was a marine painter, illustrator, and designer of stained glass. He was the first Official Canadian war artist of the Royal Canadian Navy.

== Biography ==
Murphy was born in Toronto. He studied at the Toronto Technical School, the Central Ontario School of Art and Industrial Design (now OCAD University) with C.M. Manly and Robert Holmes, and the Pennsylvania Academy of Fine Arts in Philadelphia with J. Alden Weir among other teachers, where he was awarded two Cresson European Travel Scholarships in 1913 and 1914. In Philadelphia, he painted schooners on the city waterfront, after which he studied art in Europe during the 1920s. He was a part-time instructor at the Ontario College of Art (1927–1930), and a full-time member of the staff from 1931 to 1962.

He joined the Royal Canadian Naval Volunteer Reserve in 1940 and won a prize in the First Victory Loan Poster Competition that year. In 1941–1942, he began to paint ship camouflage designs and this activity continued for some time. At least three ships were painted with his designs, HMCS Hamilton, HMCS Annapolis (104) and HMCS Assiniboine. For the next few years, he created war records drawings and paintings, going to sea at his own expense. In June 1943, Murphy became the first official war artist of the Royal Canadian Navy. He served as an Official War Artist from June 1943 until May 1944 and held the naval rank of lieutenant. He painted mostly in the Esquimalt area but also painted pictures on the Great Lakes.

He also did illustrations in the Saturday Evening Post, Maclean's, the Canadian Magazine, Saturday Night, the Canadian Home Journal, Toronto Star Weekly, and Toronto's 100 Years. He continued teaching at OCAD after the war as well as teaching for the Ontario Department of Education and wrote and illustrated articles of marine interest, as well as writing articles such as one on the Gibraltar Point Lighthouse on the Toronto Islands.

His first public show was in New York in 1919 and he had many exhibits of his work afterwards. His work is in the collection of the National Gallery of Canada, Canadian War Museum, Art Gallery of Hamilton and many other institutions. He was a member of the Royal Canadian Academy of Arts; Ontario Society of Artists; Canadian Society of Graphic Art; Canadian Society for Education Through Art; Great Lakes Historical Society (Cleveland); Model Shipbuilders' Guild (Detroit); Detroit Marine Historical Society; Niagara Historical Society; York Pioneer and Historical Society (Toronto).

Murphy died in Toronto in 1975.
