= Carl Schaefer (artist) =

Canadian artist (1903–1995)

Carl Schaefer CM, RCA
- Born: 30 April 1903; Hanover, Ontario
- Died: 21 May 1995 (aged 92); Toronto, Ontario
- Education: Ontario College of Art
- Known for: painter
- Spouse: Lillian Evers

Carl Fellman Schaefer CM RCA LL.D.

== Life and career ==
Schaefer was born in Hanover, Ontario from a farm background and studied at the Ontario College of Art with Arthur Lismer and J. E. H. MacDonald (1921–1924). In March 1927, Schaefer married his childhood friend, Lillian Evers of Neustadt, Ontario. Schaefer's primary subject matter was rural southern Ontario scenery. In 1940, he was awarded a Guggenheim Fellowship, the first given a Canadian, which allowed him to paint full-time in New England. Schaefer served with the Royal Canadian Air Force as an Official Second World War artist from 1943 to 1946, using watercolour, ink or graphite to capture his images.

He taught at Central Technical School in Toronto, beginning in 1930, and at the Ontario College of Art from 1948 to 1970. Schaefer had shows at the McCord Museum in Montreal (1967), The Robert McLaughlin Gallery in Oshawa (1976) and the Edmonton Art Gallery (1980). His works appeared in the exhibition Canadian Landscape which toured galleries in Europe from 1983 to 1985.

Schaefer was president of the Canadian Society of Painters in Water Colour from 1939 to 1941. He was an invited contributor to the Group of Seven. He also showed with the Royal Canadian Academy, the Ontario Society of Artists, the Canadian Group of Painters, and the Canadian Society of Graphic Art. Schaefer received an honorary doctorate from the University of Waterloo in 1976 and was awarded the Order of Canada two years later. His work is held in the collections of the Canadian War Museum, the National Gallery of Canada, the Art Gallery of Ontario, and the Art Gallery of Hamilton.

After a lengthy illness Schaefer died from pneumonia at Sunnybrook Health Science Centre, Toronto at the age of 92. His wife predeceased him but Schaefer was survived by his two sons.

== Bibliography ==
- Carl Schaefer Retrospective Exhibition: Paintings from 1926 to 1969. Montreal. n.d.
- Gray, Margaret (1977). Carl Schaefer. Margaret Rand, Lois Steen. Agincourt, Ontario: Gage Publishing. ISBN 0-7715-9340-6. OCLC 15846679.
