= Arthur Lismer =

English-Canadian painter (1885-1969)

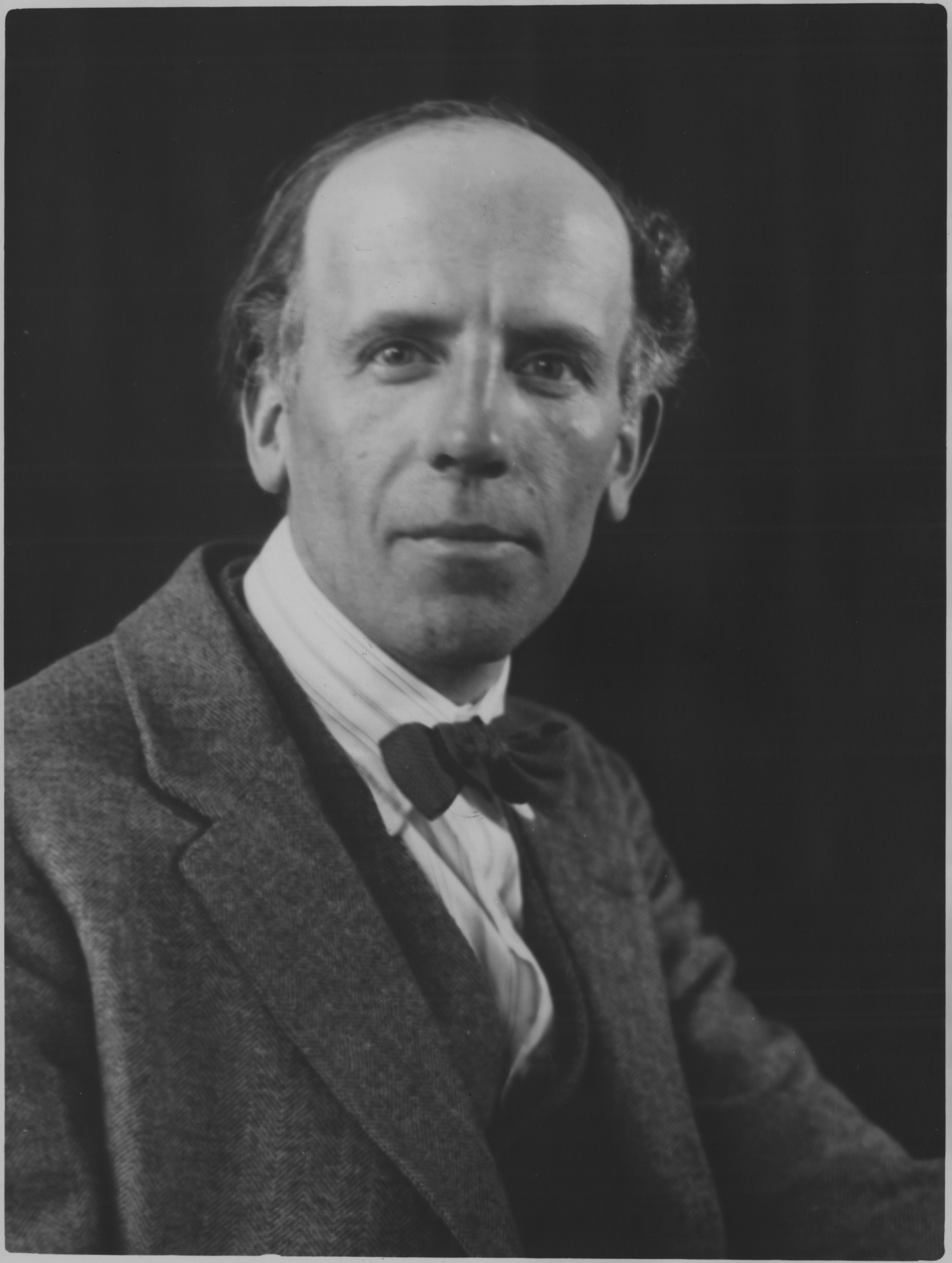
- Portrait by Melvin Ormond Hammond, 1930
- Born: 27 June 1885; Sheffield, Yorkshire, England, UK
- Died: 23 March 1969 (aged 83); Montreal, Quebec, Canada
- Known for: Painter
- Awards: Order of Canada

Arthur Lismer CC RCA (27 June 1885 – 23 March 1969) was an English born-Canadian painter, member of the Group of Seven and educator. He is known primarily as a landscape painter and for his paintings of ships in dazzle camouflage.

== Early life ==
Lismer was born in Sheffield, Yorkshire, England, the son of Harriet and Edward Lismer, a draper's buyer. At age thirteen, he apprenticed at a photo-engraving company. He was awarded a scholarship, and used this time to take evening classes at the Sheffield School of Art from 1898 until 1905. In 1905, he moved to Antwerp, Belgium, where he studied art at the Academie Royale.

Lismer immigrated to Canada in 1911, settled in Toronto, Ontario, and took a job with Grip Ltd. where he met Tom Thomson. In May 1914, he went camping with him in Algonquin Park, writing about the trip:

Our canoe was a 16 footer Chestnut, canvas covered, roomy & capable of carrying the weight we had to put in it, stores for two weeks, tent, blankets, a cooking oven and utensils, plates and pannekins of aluminum, fishing tackle, axe, & sketching impedimenta, this last consisting (for me) of two dozen 12 1/2 x 9 1/2 three ply veneer boards of birch wood back and front & soft pine inside, & good for sketching. These fit into a holder designed to carry six & two more into a flat sketch box, also about 12 to 15 pounds of paint, oil, brushes per man. When our canoe was fully laden, we had about 2 1/2 inches of free board above the water line & with our two selves about 560 lbs. in all.

== Principalship of NSCAD University ==
At thirty-one years of age, Lismer moved to Halifax, Nova Scotia in 1916 and served as the Principal of the Victoria School of Art and Design (now NSCAD University). With only twelve students when he began his principalship, Lismer was able to increase the student body to 150 pupils by the time he resigned in 1919.

With the goal of broadening the public reach of the art school, Lismer created new programs including Saturday morning art classes that he would re-create at the Art Gallery of Toronto (now the Art Gallery of Ontario). In addition to his teaching and administrative duties, he held the curatorship of the Nova Scotia Museum of Fine Arts located at the Victoria School of Art and Design.

== Official war artist ==
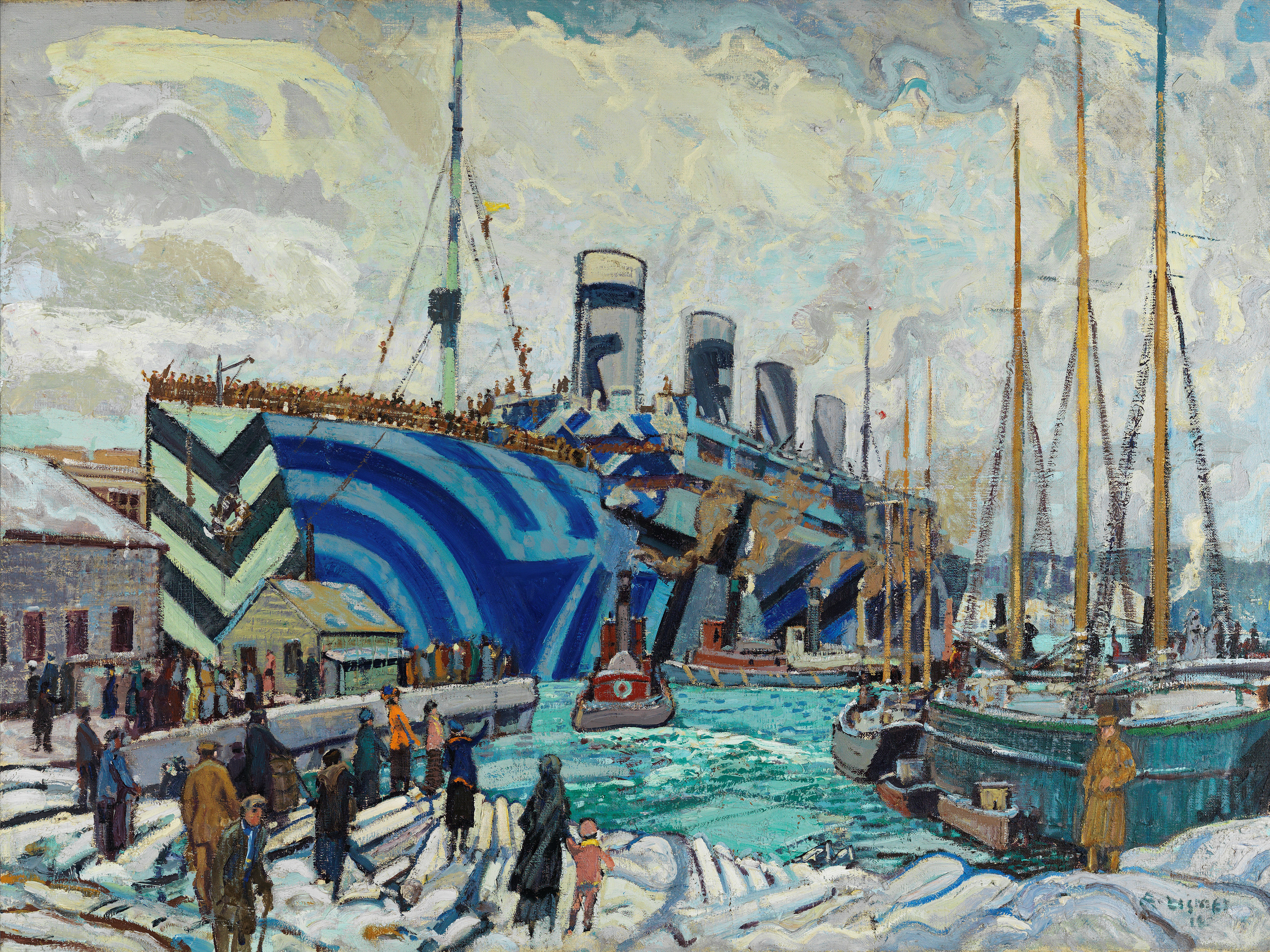
RMS Olympic in dazzle at Pier 2 in Halifax, Nova Scotia

In wartime Halifax, Lismer was inspired by the shipping and naval activity of the port, notably the dramatically painted dazzle camouflaged ships with their patterns of curved and zigzag lines designed to mislead German U-boats and submarines. Lismer's work came to the attention of Lord Beaverbrook who arranged for Lismer to be commissioned as an official war artist. His best-known work from the war years depicted what he observed and learned about in Halifax, Nova Scotia: Mine sweeping, convoying, patrolling and harbour defense. Lismer completed a number of oil studies and finished several major canvases during 1918 and 1919. These included the large and ebullient Convoy in Bedford Basin (c.1919), which depicts merchant ships forming a transatlantic convoy near Halifax. He also did some sketches of the Halifax Explosion.

During his time as a war artist, he wrote a booklet for the Canadian Armed Services titled How to get started: Watercolor Painting for Pleasure.

== Group of Seven and afterwards ==
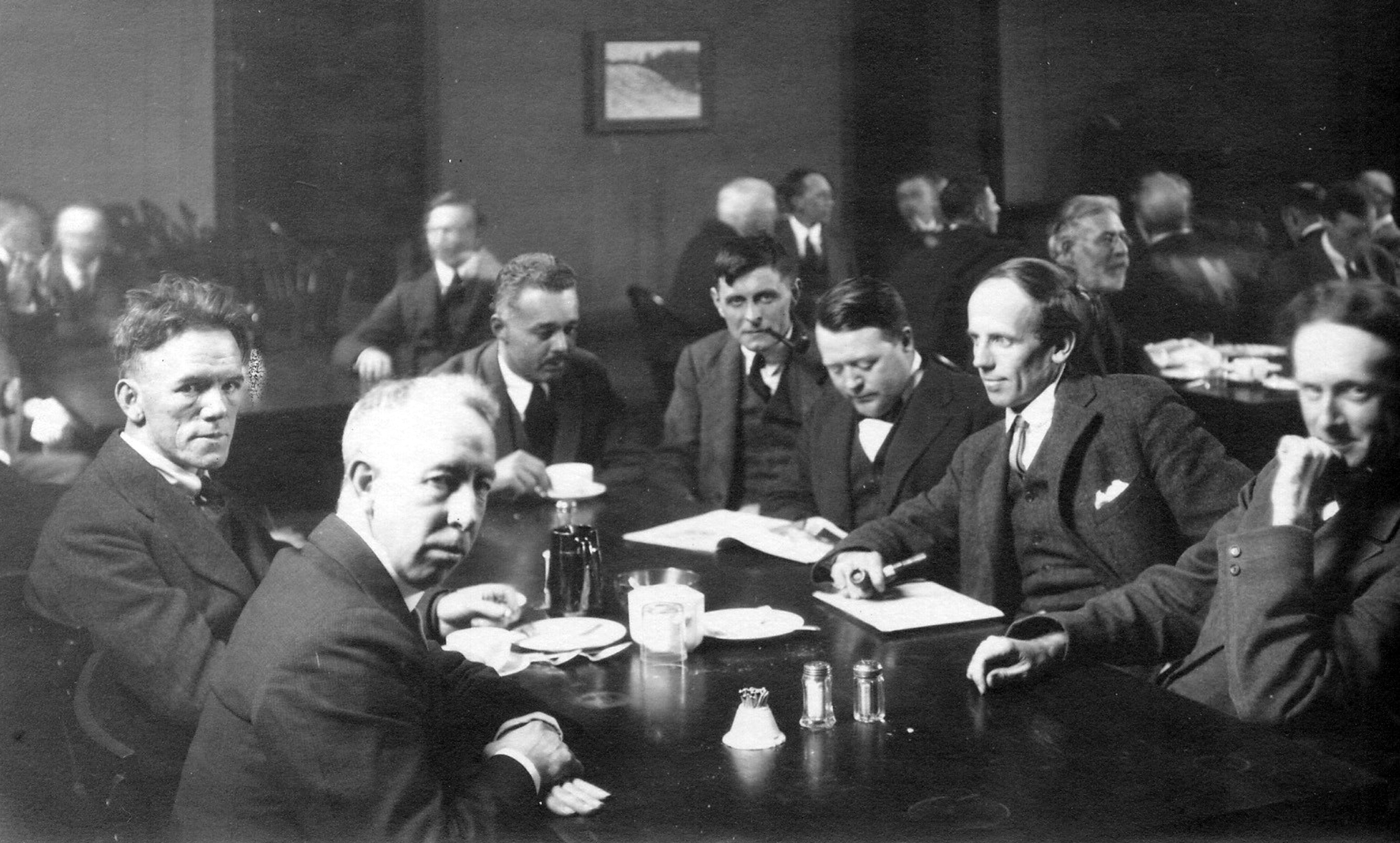
Group of seven artists: Frederick Varley, A. Y. Jackson, Lawren Harris, Fairley, Frank Johnston (artist), Arthur Lismer, and J. E. H. MacDonald

Lismer returned to Toronto in 1919 when he was appointed vice-principal of the Ontario College of Art. With the collaboration of four artists at Grip where Lismer had previously worked, he helped found the Group of Seven, whose work contributed to the process of giving Canada a distinctive national voice in painting. (Note: Several members of the Group of Seven later became members of the Canadian Group of Painters including Lawren Harris, A. J. Casson, Arthur Lismer, A. Y. Jackson, and Franklin Carmichael. The group was known for its depictions of Canadian subjects.) He also worked with the cadre at Grip Ltd.

Arthur Lismer's style was influenced by his pre-Canadian experience (primarily in Antwerp), where he found the Barbizon and Post-Impressionist movements a key inspiration. Collaborating with the group of artists who would, in 1920, become the Group of Seven, Lismer exhibited the characteristic post-impressionist style, and spiritual connection with the landscape that would embody that group's work. Like the other members of the Group of Seven many of his works began as small en plein air sketches in oil on hardboard. Like other members of the Group of Seven too, Lismer became a member of the Canadian Group of Painters in 1933.

During the Centennial of the City of Toronto, in 1934, Lismer was on the Pictures Committee. His work in art education was effective; and this service to the wider community caused Lismer to become influential in ways not always achieved by his artist colleagues. For example, he started a children's art program at the Art Gallery of Toronto, which became successful in the 1930s. In 1936, as Lismer's prominence in the field of art education involved him in international travels, he went on a one-year tour of South Africa. Together with art educator Norah McCullough, he organized art education programmes, lectured on Canadian art and gave workshops for teachers. On the trip, he painted extensively in watercolour.

He moved to Montreal in 1940, as a result of being given a teaching appointment at the Art Association of Montreal and established the MMFA School of Art and Design. He joined the McGill School of Architecture as a sessional lecturer in 1943 at the invitation of John Bland, the School’s director, and was appointed assistant professor in 1945, retiring in 1955 at the age of seventy.

Between 1940 and 1950, he travelled in the summertime to the east coast of Canada to paint. He particularly liked to paint fishermen`s gear on the docks of Cape Breton Island, Nova Scotia.

In 1951, a retrospective exhibition of Lismer's work, originating at the Art Gallery of Toronto, traveled in an abbreviated version to the Art Gallery of Greater Victoria, the Vancouver Art Gallery and the University of British Columbia Fine Arts Gallery and may have influenced him to take his first trip to the West Coast in the summer of that year. Using Galiano Island as a base, he explored Pender and Saltspring Islands, as well as Victoria and Long Beach on Vancouver Island.

Lismer died on March 23, 1969, in Montreal, Quebec, and was buried alongside other members of the original Seven on the grounds of the McMichael Canadian Art Collection. His papers and some of his sketches are preserved in the McMichael Canadian Art Collection Archives and Library.

== Awards and honours ==
- 1941: Honorary degree from Dalhousie University, Halifax;
- 1962: Canada Council Medal for his contribution to Canadian art;
- 1967: Honorary degree from McGill University, Montreal
- 1967: Canadian Centennial Medal;
- 1967: Companion of the Order of Canada.

== Legacy ==
In Toronto, Lismer Hall, the auditorium at Humberside Collegiate Institute is named in his honour. He painted one of the largest murals in Canada for the school during the 1930s that hangs on the auditorium's walls today.

Lismer has been designated as an Historic Person in the Directory of Federal Heritage Designations.

== Record sale prices ==
At the June 8, 2023 Cowley Abbott Auction, Artwork from an Important Private Collection - Part II, A September Gale, Georgian Bay (1921), oil on wood, 11.5 x 16 ins ( 29.2 x 40.6 cms ), Auction Estimate: $100,000.00 - $150,000.00, realized a price of $432,000.00.

At the Cowley Abbott Auction of An Important Private Collection of Canadian Art - Part III, December 6, 2023, lot 107, Lismer's Ragged Lake, Algonquin Park, 1914, oil on canvas 30 x 22 ins (76.2 x 55.9 cms), Auction Estimate: $250,000.00 - $350,000.00, realized a price of $504,000.00.

== See also ==
- Canadian official war artists
