= Lest We Forget Project =

Canadian student research program

The Lest We Forget Project is a project by Canadian Schools in cooperation with Library and Archives Canada and the Canadian War Museum. In this project, students attend Library & Archives to study files of World War I and World War II soldiers. This helps students understand the contributions made for them, by the military.

The program began in 2001 after Blake Seward, a history teacher from Smiths Falls, Ontario decided to teach his class about World War I through researching soldiers, nurses and other participants in the war.

In January 2010, Library and Archives Canada announced cutbacks to the program. Through a joint effort with the Royal Canadian Legion and the War Museum, the program still exists for the use of students. Much of the information was made available online for the ease of research for students.

== Sources ==
1. "How The Project Came About" - Collections Canada
2. Lest We Forget Project - Ottawa Sun
3. First World War Shops Soon To Be History - Globe & Mail
4. "Award given to Black Seward"
