= Canadian War Museum =

- Musée canadien de la guerre

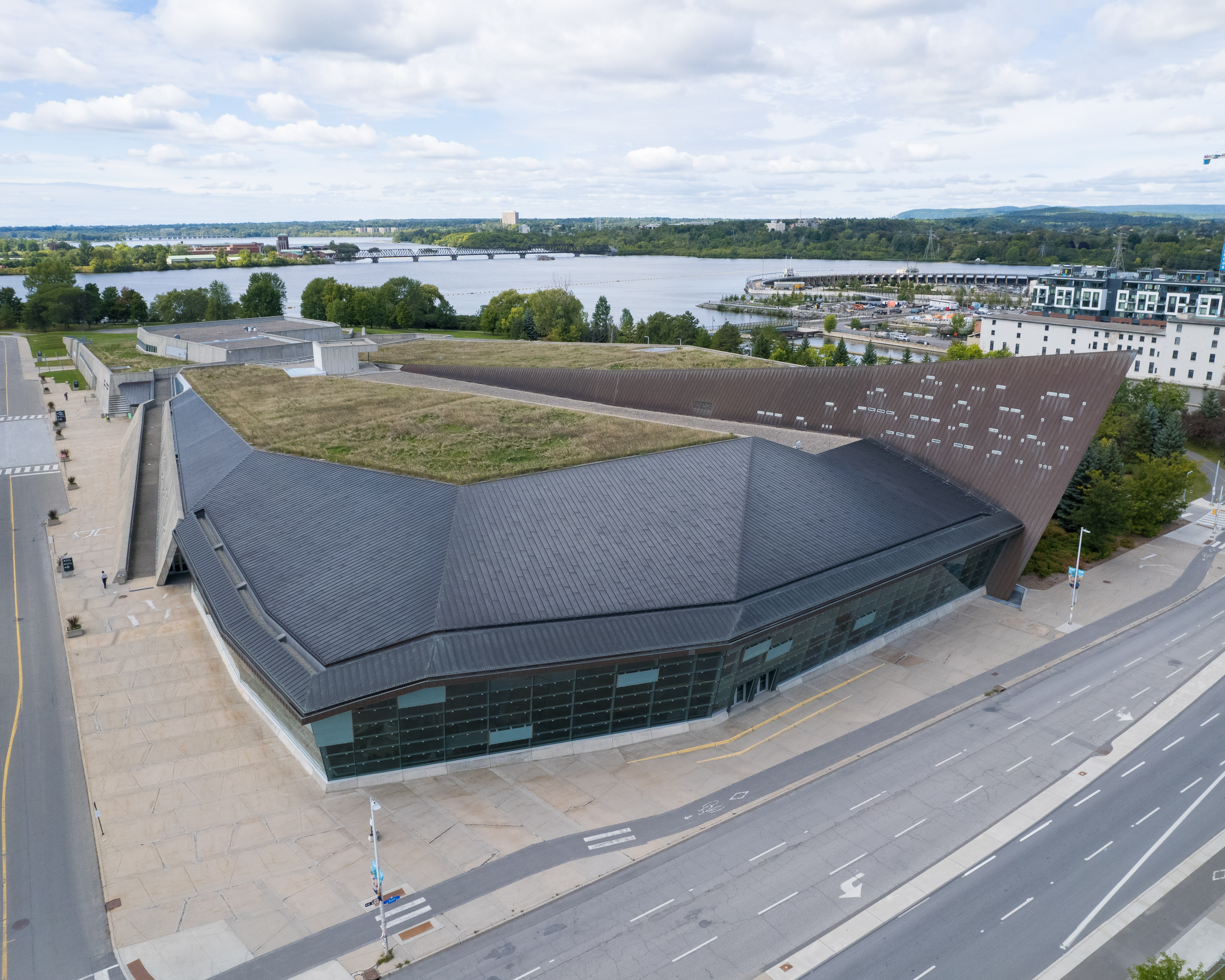
- Exterior of the museum in 2022
- Established: January 1942; 84 years ago
- Location: 1 Vimy Place, Ottawa, Ontario, Canada
- Coordinates: 45°25′02″N 75°43′02″W
- Type: War museum
- Director: Caroline Dromaguet (interim)
- President: Mark O'Niell
- Chairperson: James Fleck
- Architects: Moriyama & Teshima Architects & Griffiths Rankin Cook Architects
- Owner: Canadian Museum of History
- Public transit access: Pimisi
- Website: www.warmuseum.ca

Canadian Museum of History network
- Canadian Museum of History; Canadian War Museum; Virtual Museum of New France

The Canadian War Museum (CWM) (French: Musée canadien de la guerre) is a national museum on the country's military history in Ottawa, Ontario, Canada. The museum serves as both an educational facility on Canadian military history and a place of remembrance. The 40,860 square metres (439,800 sq ft) museum building is situated south of the Ottawa River in LeBreton Flats. The museum houses a number of exhibitions and memorials, in addition to a cafeteria, theatre, curatorial and conservation spaces, as well as storage space. The building also houses the Military History Research Centre, the museum's library and archives.

The Canadian War Museum was formally established in 1942, although portions of the museum's collections originate from a military museum that operated from 1880 to 1896. The museum was operated by the Public Archives of Canada until 1967, when the National Museums of Canada Corporation was formed to manage several national institutions, including the war museum. In the same year, the war museum was relocated from its original building to the former Public Archives of Canada building. Management of the museum was later assumed by the Canadian Museum of Civilization Corporation (later renamed the Canadian Museum of History Corporation) in 1990. Plans to expand the museum during the mid-1990s resulted in the construction of a new building at LeBreton Flats. Designed by Moriyama & Teshima Architects and Griffiths Rankin Cook Architects, the new Canadian War Museum building was opened to the public in 2005.

The museum's collection contains more than 500,000 items related to military history, including more than 13,000 works of military art. In addition to its permanent exhibition, the museum has hosted and organized a number of travelling exhibitions relating to Canadian military history.

== History ==
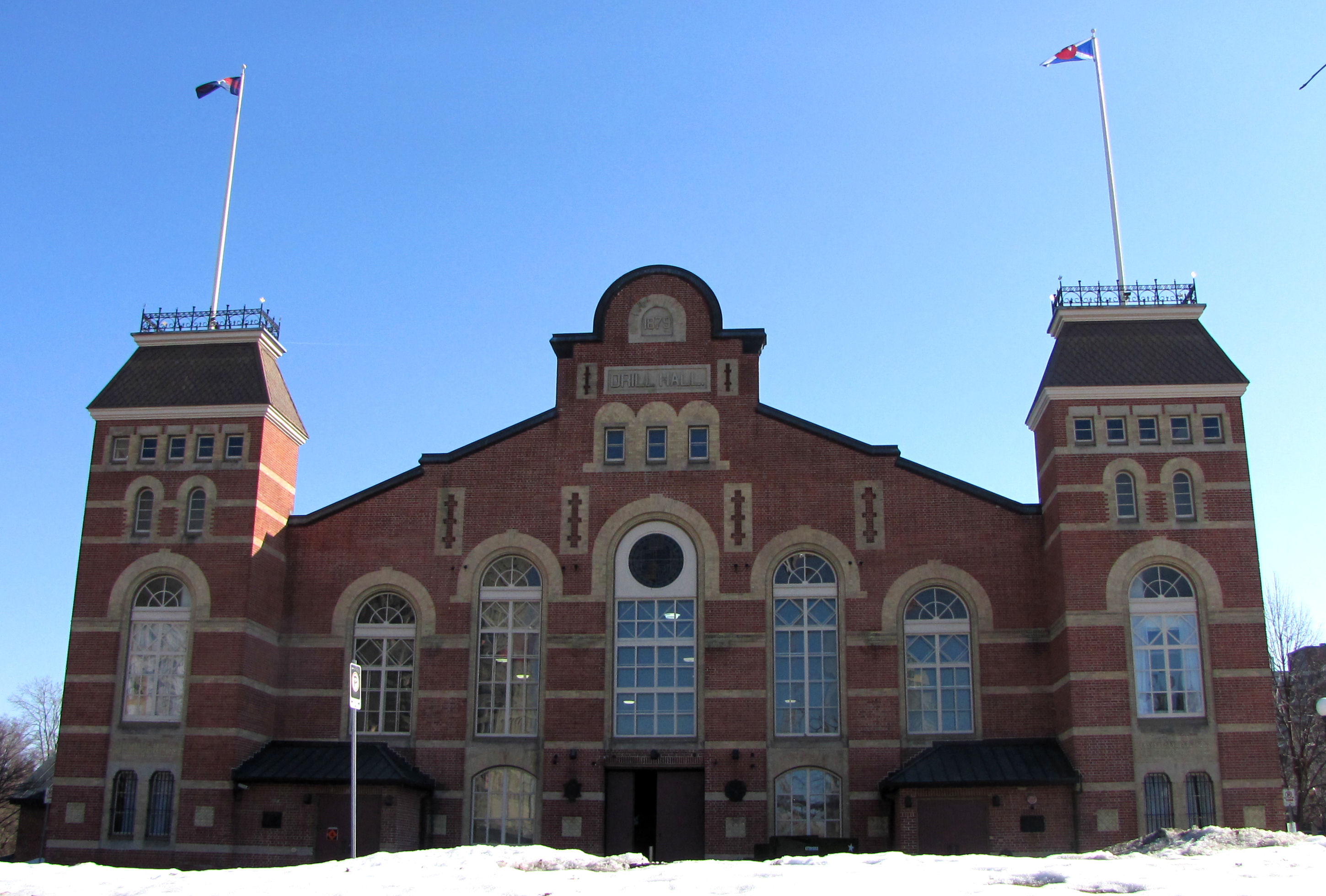
Cartier Square Drill Hall housed the Cartier Square Military Museum from 1880 to 1896. The military museum served as the predecessor to the Canadian War Museum

=== Background ===
The collections of the Canadian War Museum originated from the collections of the Cartier Square Military Museum, established through a general order on 5 November 1880. Established with the intention to be a museum of national interest, the institution sought to preserve historical records and materials relating to the Canadian Militia, and any of its colonial predecessors. A proposal to establish a library operated by the museum was made in 1882, although these plans never came to fruition. As the museum continued to solicit donations for its collection the museum quickly outgrew its space in the drill hall, and appeals for a new facility were made by 1886. The museum was closed in 1896, to make room for a new shipment of Lee-Enfield rifles and space training.

The militia office originally intended for the museum to be relocated, storing its collections in an old military warehouse below Parliament Hill (present location of the Bytown Museum). In July 1901, the Department of Militia and Defence negotiated a lease to house the museum in a building in Ottawa. However, little effort was put into reopening the museum, with the department opting to not renew the building's lease in 1905. On 26 January 1907, the Militia Council was informed by Eugène Fiset, the quartermaster-general of the Canadian Militia, that there was "no interest being taken by the officers of the garrison" to reopen the museum, and recommend to not reopening it.

The collection from the Cartier Square Military Museum remained at the warehouse until Dominion Archivist, Arthur Doughty, requested the transference of the items to the archives to display some of them. The militia approved the request, and transferred 105 items to the Dominion Archives between 1910 and 1919; although in doing so, the militia believed the archives had assumed responsibility for establishing any future military museum. By the 1910s, the militia began to redirect potential donors of military artifacts to the Dominion Archives.

These artifacts, in addition to captured German weapons from the First World War, were exhibited for the first time in a travelling exhibition in 1916. In December 1918, the Commission on War Records and Trophies was established to distribute German war trophies and war-related materials to memorials across Canada. However, the Commission retained several pieces at the Dominion Archives with the hope they would eventually be exhibited in a national museum. In 1924, the War Trophy Building was built adjacent to the original Dominion Archives building to house the military collection. In 1935, Doughty struck a deal with General Andrew McNaughton, the Chief of General Staff, for the militia to support the establishment of the museum. A War Trophies Review Board was established between the archives and militia, charged with selecting the best items to preserve for a future museum.

=== Establishment ===
The Canadian War Museum was formally opened at the War Trophies Building in January 1942; initially operated by the Dominion Archives, and partially funded by the Department of National Defence. In 1958, management of the Canadian War Museum was assumed by the National Museum of Canada (predecessor to the Canadian Museum of History and the Canadian Museum of Nature).

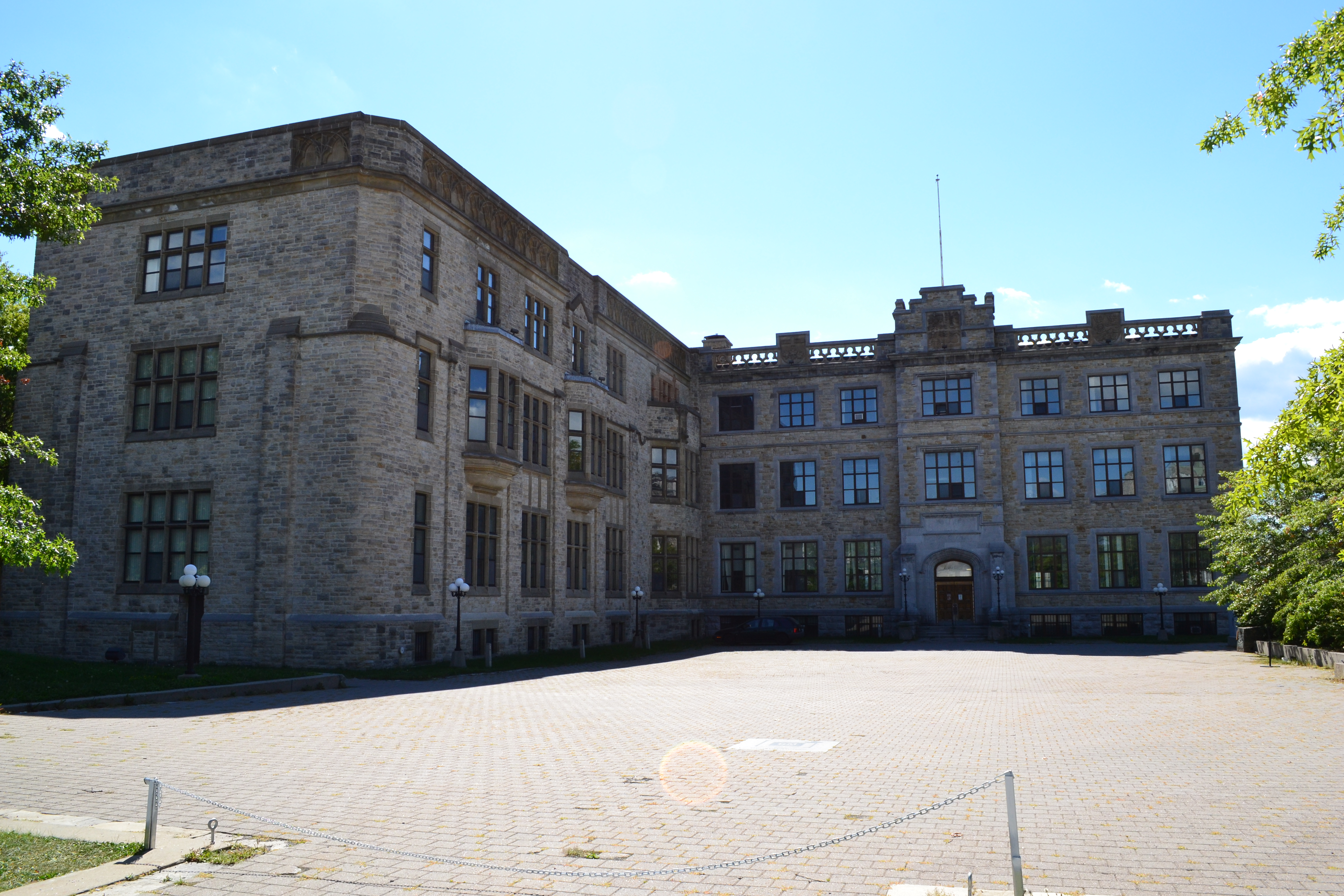
The original Dominion Archives building housed the war museum from 1967 to 2005

The museum relocated to the original Dominion Archives building, adjacent to the War Trophies building in June 1967; after the Public Archives of Canada moved its operations to a new facility. However, the museum continued to use the War Trophies building as a storage facility. In the same year, management of the war museum was assumed by the National Museums of Canada Corporation; a crown corporation which managed several national institutions, including the war museum.

In 1983 the museum relocated its storage facilities from the War Trophies building to Vimy House; with the former building demolished to make way for the National Gallery of Canada's new building. In 1990, the Canadian Museum of Civilization Corporation (later renamed the Canadian Museum of History Corporation) was formed through The Museum Act, and assumed management of several national museums of Canada, including the war museum.

By the 1990s, the museum's staff had voiced that the space in the building was inadequate, with some areas of the building deemed environmentally hazardous for the exhibition of certain artifacts. In 1991, the government established the Task Force on Military History Museum Collections in Canada, whose final report called for more resources to be given to the museum, referring to its shape in the original Dominion Archives building as "embarrassing," and a "national disgrace." Although the Canadian Museum of Civilization Corporation invested C$1.7 million for new exhibit designs as a result of the report; funds remained limited for expansion, with the federal government implementing a number of austerity measures during the mid-1990s. A museum supporter's group, the "Friends of the Canadian War Museum" was established in 1995 to assist the museum in fundraising efforts.

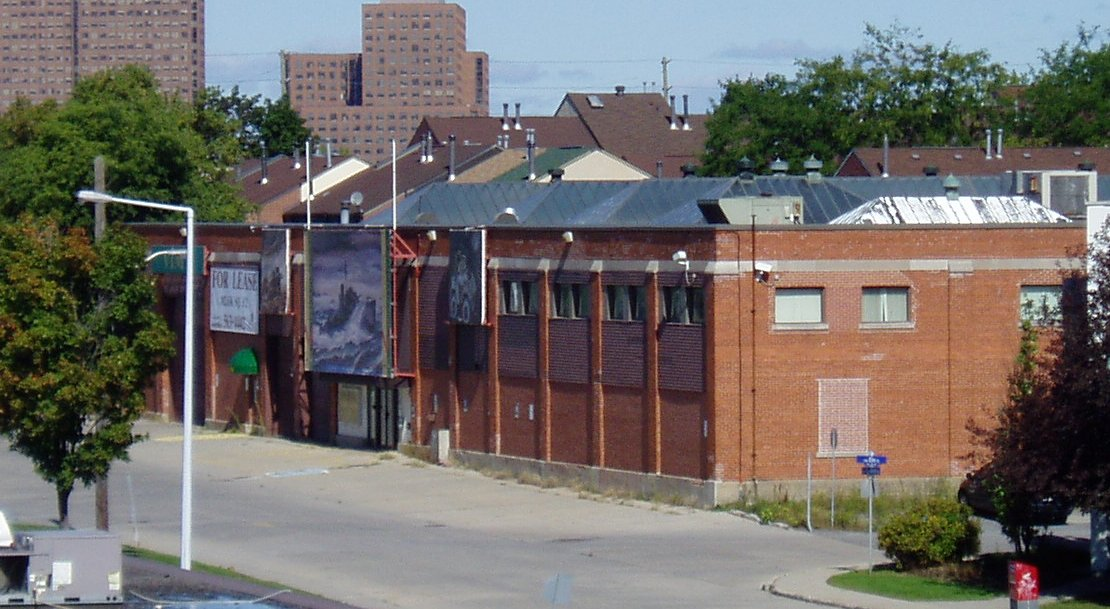
Exterior of Vimy House. From 1983 to 2004, items from the museum's collection that were not on display were stored at Vimy House.

Between 1996 and 1997, the museum considered opening a large Holocaust exhibition within the museum. In addition to the exhibition, the architectural expansion plans released in November 1997 included enhanced exhibit spaces, a theatre, and a memorial chamber. However, the proposed exhibit was opposed by Canadian veterans, who felt a sense of neglect by the museum, and believed an exhibition on the Holocaust would further marginalize them; in addition to some historians who believed the museum was an inappropriate space for such an exhibition. Following events commemorating the 50th anniversary of the end of the Second World War passed, public debate over the museum's future intensified; with the Senate Subcommittee on Veterans Affairs convening a hearing in February 1998 to determine the future of the exhibition and the museum itself. Following the Senate Subcommittee hearings, the chair of the Canadian Museum of Civilization Corporation, Adrienne Clarkson announced the museum would abandon its plans for a Holocaust exhibition, although proceed with its plans to expand the museum.

Barney Danson was appointed to the board of trustees and the war museum advisory committee in 1998. This led to an increase in the museum's research capacity and towards the establishment of the Centre of Military History. Danson later secured for the museum the acquisition of property near CFB Rockcliffe.

=== 21st century ===
In March 2000, the Government of Canada formally announced plans to build a new museum building at CFB Rockcliffe. However, in 2001, Canadian Prime Minister Jean Chrétien intervened to have the proposed location changed to LeBreton Flats, a formerly industrial area of the city. LeBreton Flats was initially rejected as a site for the new museum building during the planning stages of the project as the site was contaminated. However, Chrétien proposed to decontaminate the site, with the museum serving as the centrepiece for the area's revitalization efforts. In 2001, a design submitted by Moriyama & Teshima Architects and Griffiths Rankin Cook Architects was selected for the design of the new building. Groundbreaking for the new building took place in November 2002, followed by a major decontamination effort of the property by the National Capital Commission.

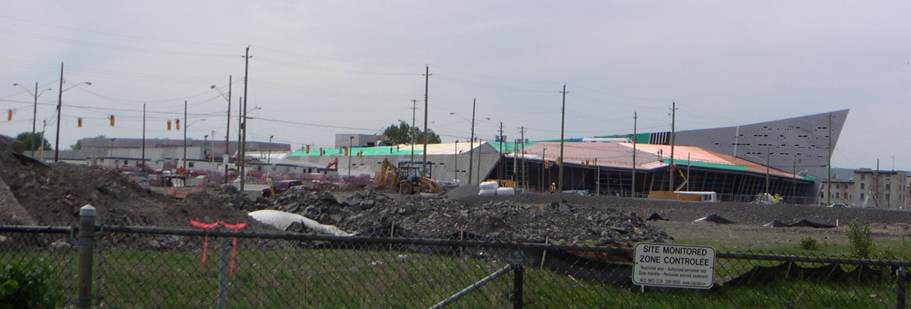
Construction for the new museum building in May 2004

By 2004 the museum began to move its larger artifacts from its exhibits, as well as its storage facility into the new building. By the end of 2004, the museum closed its storage facility in Vimy House and closed its facility in the original Dominion Archives building in January 2005. The new building was opened on 8 May 2005, coinciding with the 60th anniversary of Victory in Europe day. On the same day the new building was opened to the public, Canada Post issued a 50¢ stamp to commemorate the opening of the new museum. The total cost to build a new building for the museum, and the exhibitions was approximately C$135 million.

Shortly after its opening of the new building, the museum became the centre of controversy over its interpretation of the Combined Bomber Offensive during World War II, in which some 20,000 Canadians participated. Much of the controversy stemmed from two assertions made on a museum label, that the bombing offensive was largely ineffective until later in the war, and that its morality and value of strategic bombings remained contested. Complaints from Canadian veterans prompted another Senate Subcommittee to be launched. Museum staff eventually removed the offending museum label, replacing it with another label with text three times in length that "glossed over the salient facts;" although the offending images remained.

== Site ==
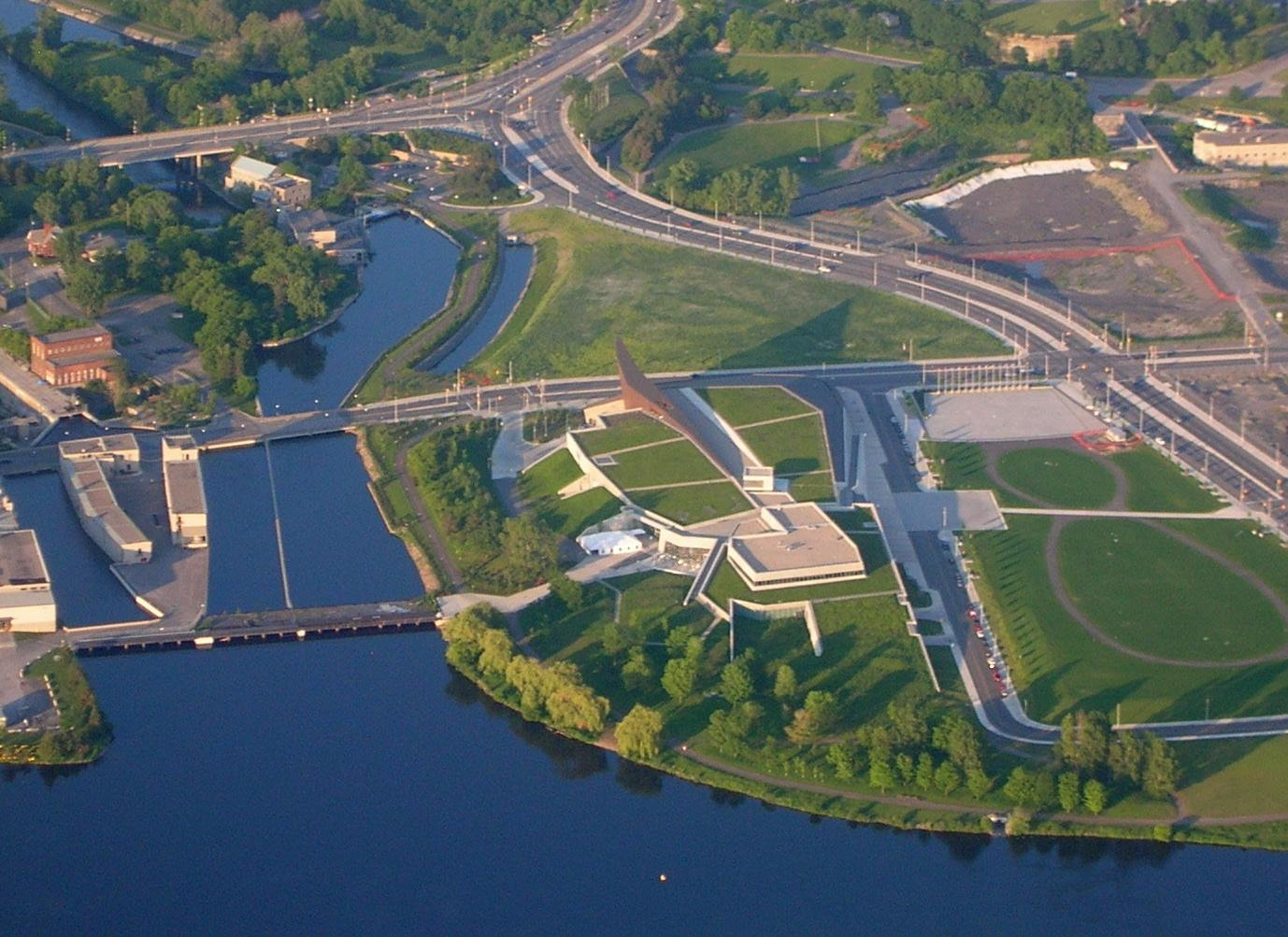
Aerial view of the museum's green roof, with the Ottawa River and Capital Pathway adjacent to the building.

The 7.5 hectares (19 acres) property is situated within LeBreton Flats, a neighbourhood within Ottawa, the capital city of Canada. The property is situated southwest of Parliament Hill and the National War Memorial. The property is bounded by roadways to the east and south, by the Capital Pathway, and the southern banks of the Ottawa River to the west and north. Water from the Ottawa River is drawn into the building for mechanical cooling, and ground irrigation of the larger property.

Directly south of the museum building is an urban park called The Commons, used for various events hosted by the museum. A wheelchair accessible pathway built around the building's green roof connects The Commons with the parkland to the north of the museum.

=== Building ===
The 440,000-square-metre-building (4,700,000 sq ft) was designed by Moriyama & Teshima Architects & Griffiths Rankin Cook Architects; with Raymond Moriyama and Alex Rankin as the principal architect. Stantec was contracted as the civil engineering consultant, whereas PCL Construction was contracted as the project's construction manager. The cost to construct the building was approximately C$96 million.

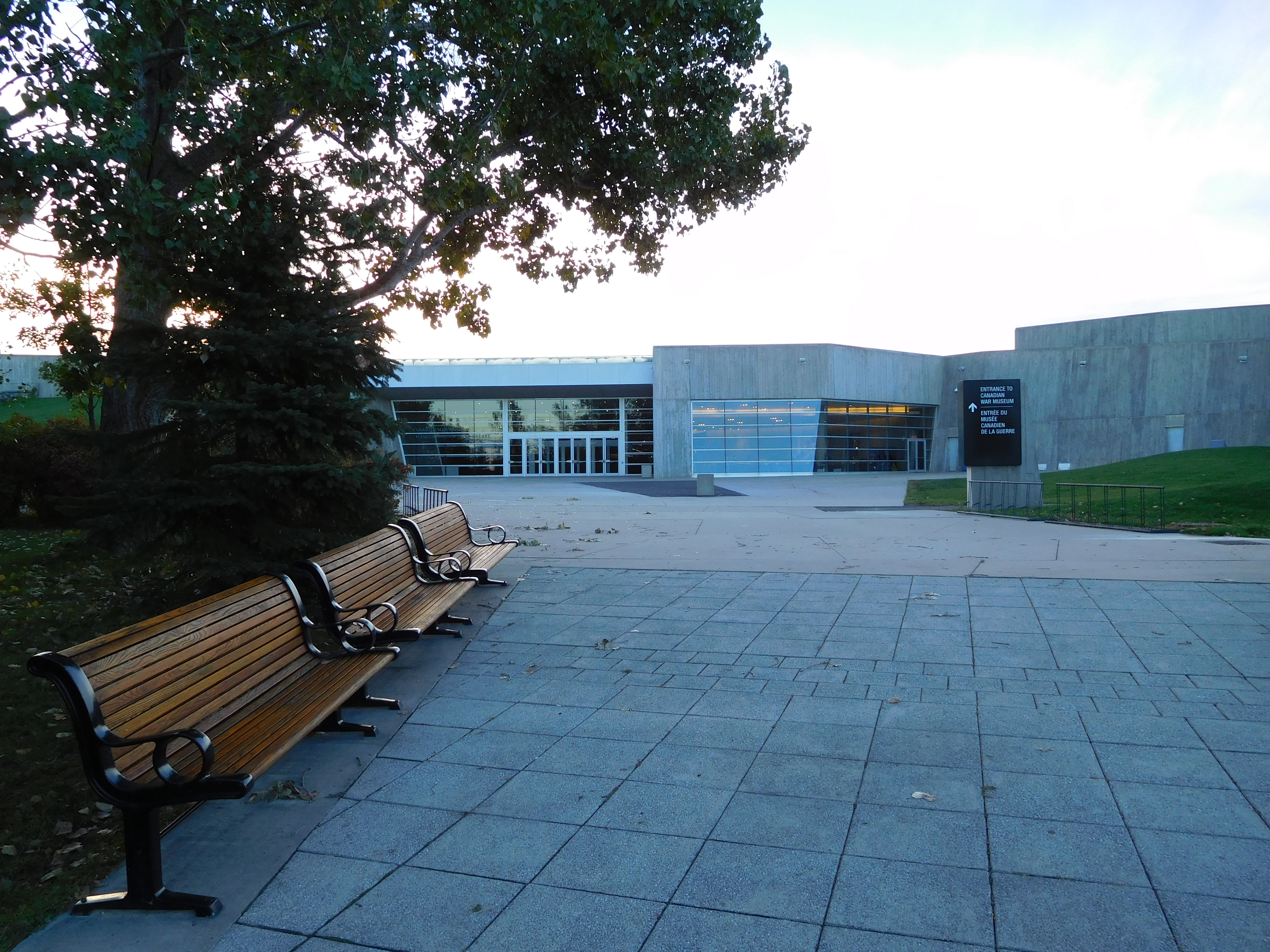
Concrete and glass facade at the north entrance to the museum

Regeneration served as the primary theme for the architectural design team of the building, with the design intended to showcase war's impact on nature; and nature's ability to regrow and "regenerate" from war. Tilted and jagged planes, along with roughhewn materials are used throughout the building in a form of "controlled imperfection", intended to create the impression of trauma and disequilibrium. The building's massing largely remains low to the ground, with only the building's eastern portions only rising high above. A significant portion of the building is made out of concrete, with 36,000 cubic metres (47,086 yd^{3}) of cast-in-place concrete used throughout the building; in addition to 3,750 tonnes of reinforced steel. Many of the exterior and interior walls of the building are placed on a variety of angles, from 90 degrees to 31 degrees, with eight different angles in all used throughout the building.

==== Exterior ====
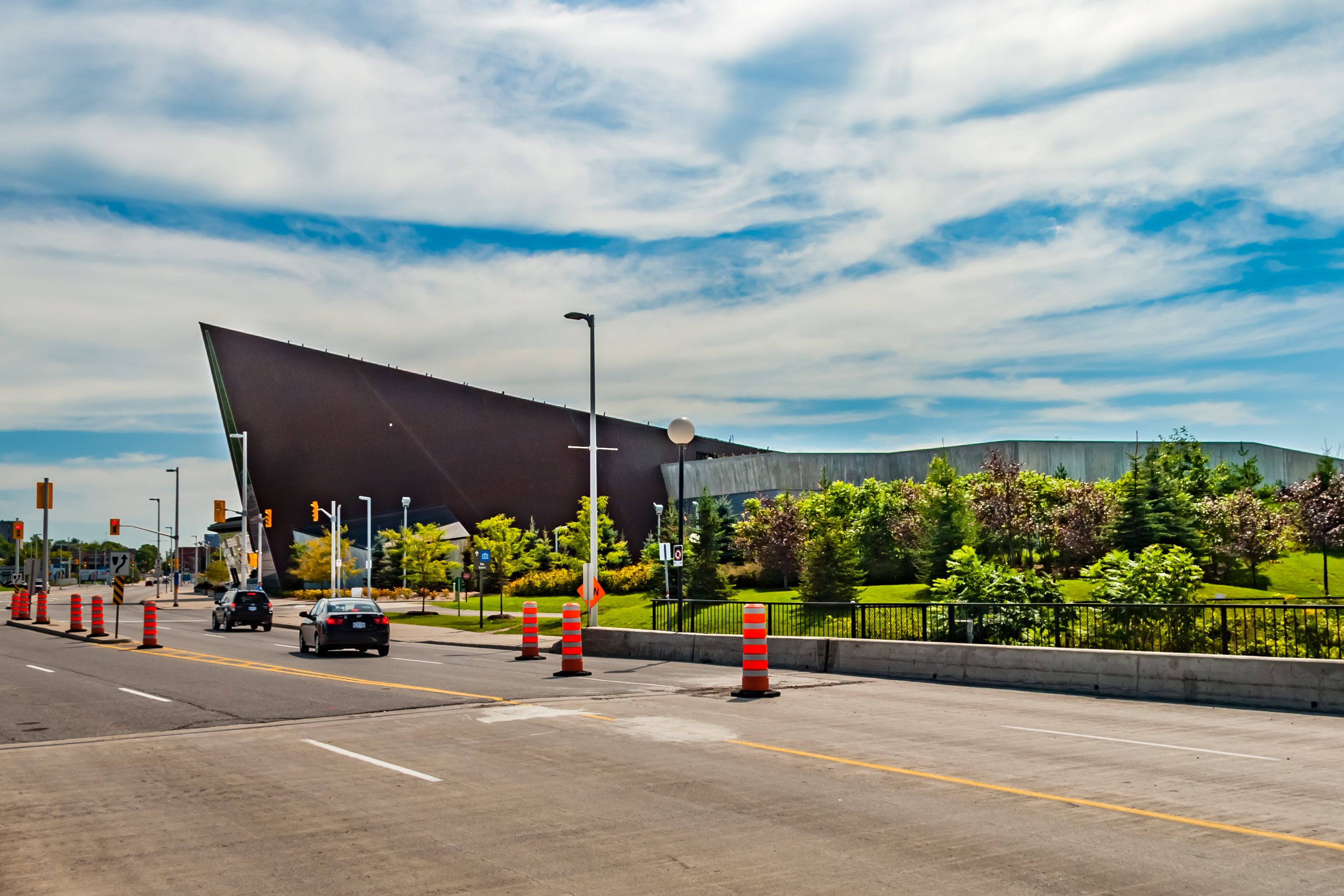
Exterior of the Canadian War Museum from the north

With regeneration being the primary theme of the architectural design, the external lines of the building were designed to evoke the "devastations of war," with the building appearing to emerge from a "scarred landscape". The angular building was designed to appear as if it was "emerging from the Ottawa River. The highest point of the building rises 24 metres (79 ft) off the ground, and faces towards the Canadian Parliament Buildings, and Peace Tower.

A 20,500 square metres (221,000 sq ft) self-seeding green roof, which connects to the surrounding parkland and riverfront, is also situated on the rooftop of the building. The green roof was incorporated into the museum building in order to reflect the building's larger theme of regeneration; with the green rooftop intended to appear as nature fusing with ruins, showcasing the process of regeneration. The green roof also provides the building with some sustainability benefits; being an economical and efficient solution for stormwater management in the area, providing energy savings, and providing air pollution remediation. The roof was designed to mimic the urban development of the area, with the western portions of the rooftop closer to the rural areas of Ottawa designed to blend in with the surrounding parkland, while the eastern portion closer to downtown Ottawa features sloped concrete slopes that provide visitors with a view into the museum from the rooftop.

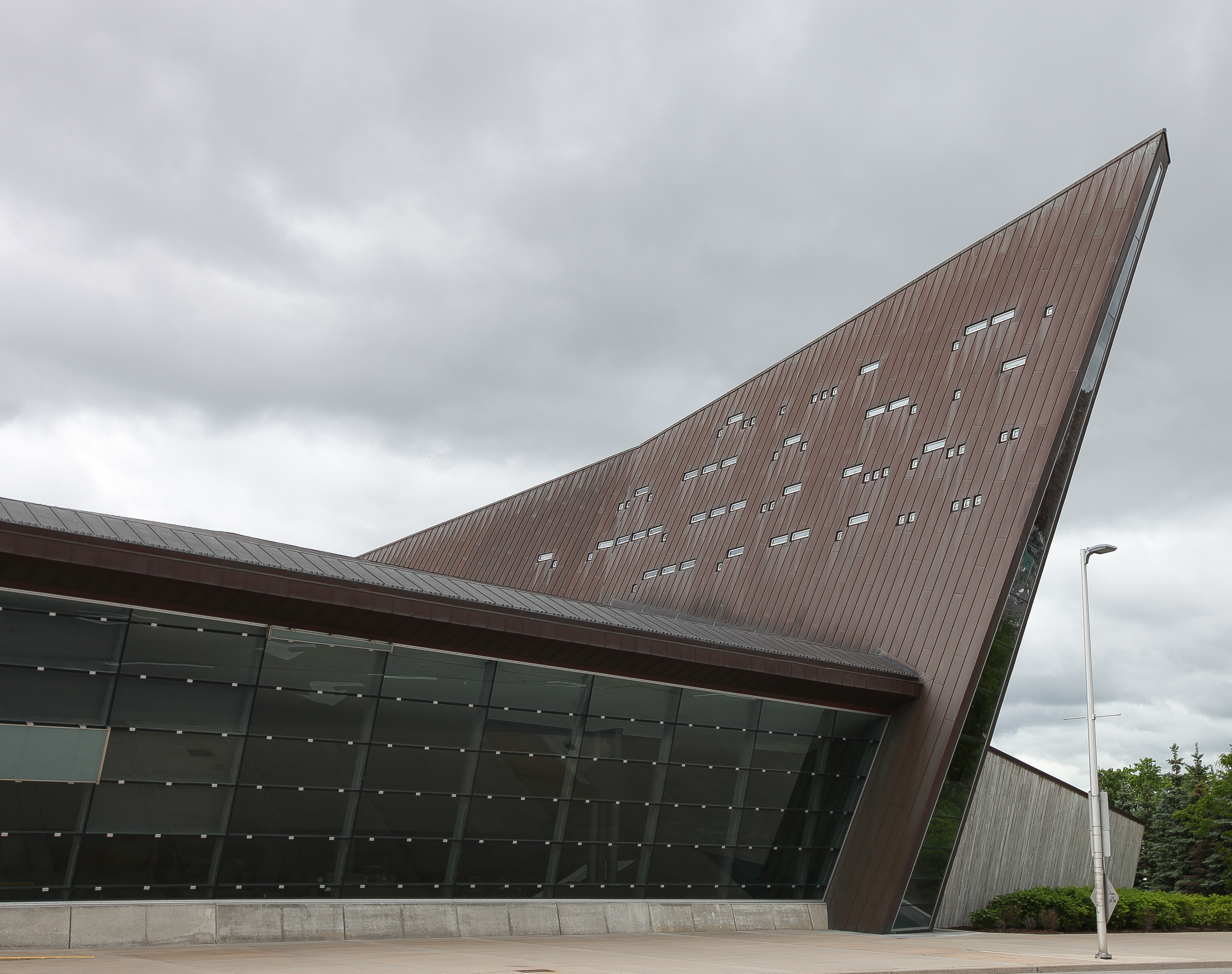
Southeastern glass façade the building. Windows along the protrusion are arranged to spell "lest we forget/n'oublions jamais in Morse code.

Nearly the entire southeastern façade of the building is covered in glass, providing people outside the museum a view of some of its items on display in the LeBreton Gallery, an open-storage exhibition space in the building. Near the top of the building's walls are a series of small windows that spell out "lest we forget/n'oublions jamais" in Morse code. The exposed concrete board-form exterior is fitted with cast-in-place insulated concrete wall panels. Conversely, the entrance of the building is fitted with aluminum frames; with the canted curtain wall facing Parliament Hill.

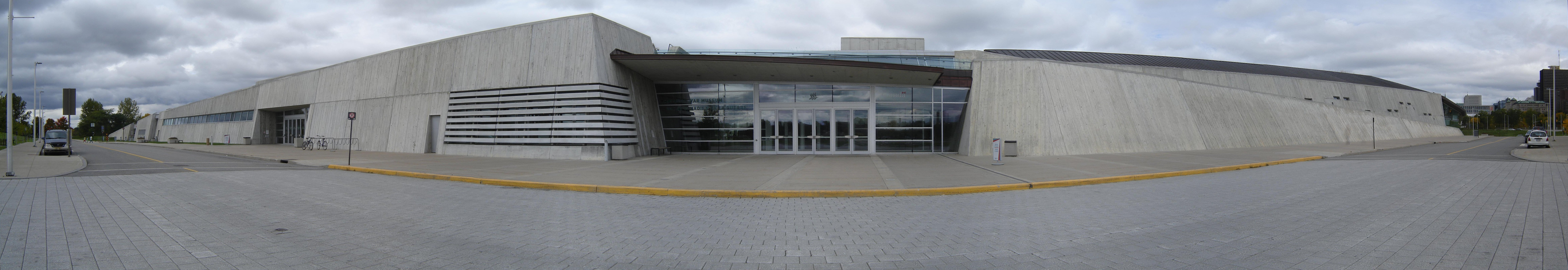
Panorama of the concrete façade on the southern exterior of the building from Vimy Place

==== Interior ====
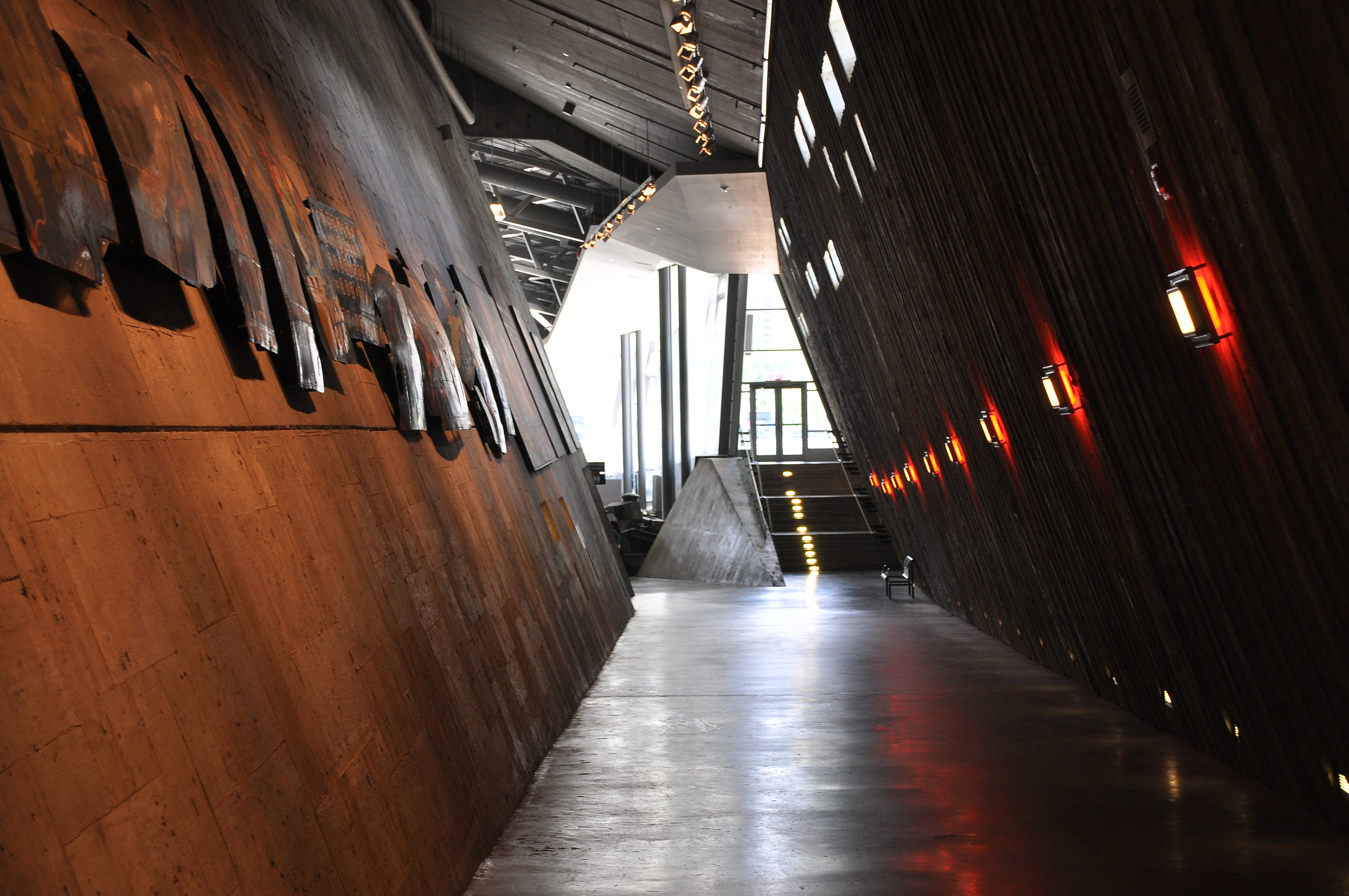
An angled concrete wall line a hallway leading to the museum's exhibition space.

The interior walls of the building are primarily made out of concrete that incorporates up to 15 per cent recycled fly ash, making the walls of the building a large energy-conserving mass. The walls are designed to emerge sharply from the ground, in an unusual fashion; whereas the floors were designed with slight slopes within them. Together, these design features are intended to evoke the feeling of instability with the museum's visitors. All the galleries within the building include ramps and slopes, making all exhibits in the museum wheelchair accessible.

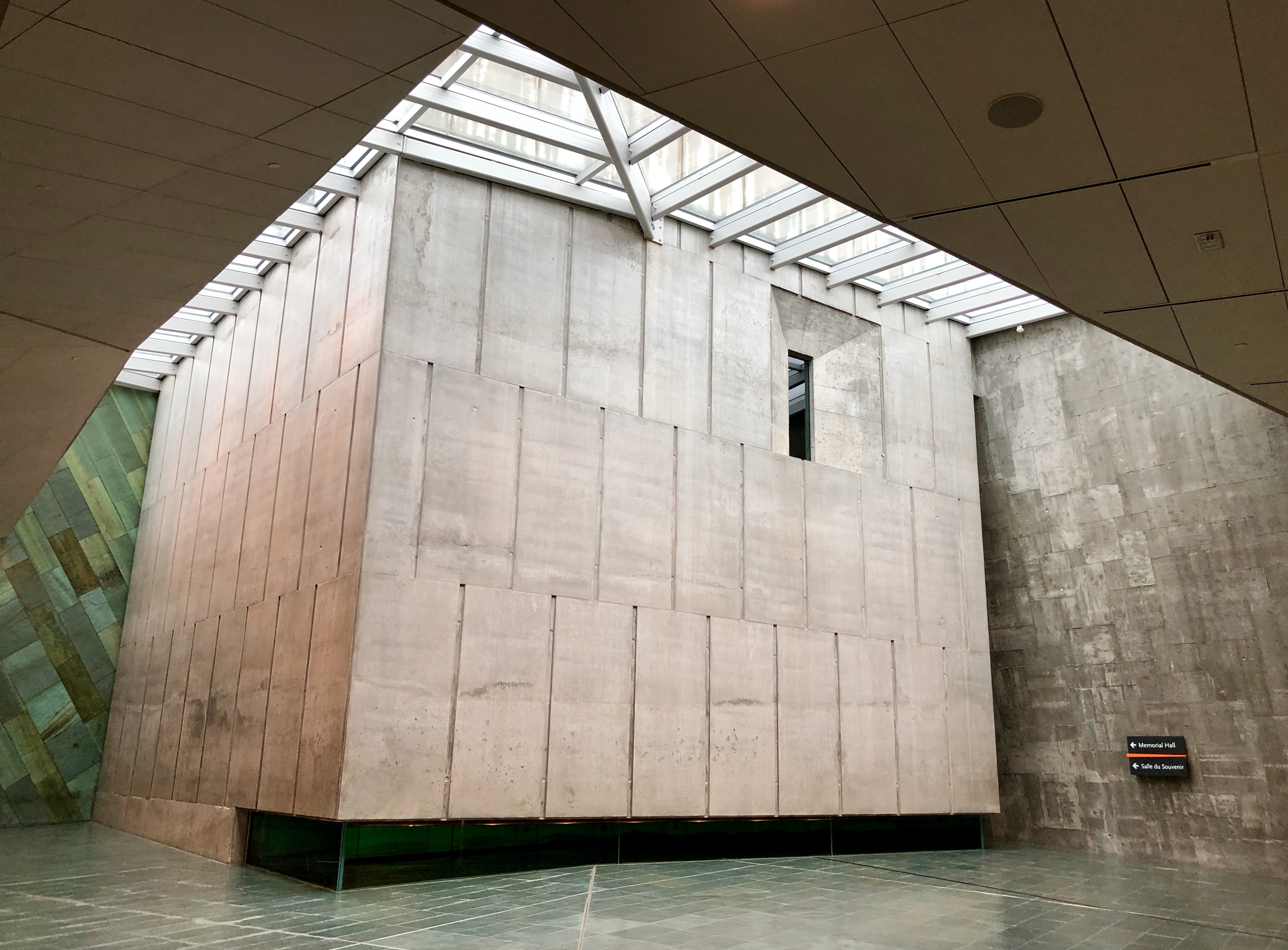
Exterior façade of Memorial Hall from the museum's lobby.

Concrete is a major material used in the museum's lobby; with post-tensioned concrete beams extending throughout the foyer, in addition to 596 tonnes of exposed structural steel. One side of the lobby's walls is textured and patterned like rough-hewn wooden planks, whereas the other side is patterned to resemble large blocks of quarried stone. In addition to concrete, copper that was originally used on the roof of the Library of Parliament is used on the walls of the museum lobby and the LeBreton Gallery. However, most of the building's interior space remains austere, to provide visitors with a solemn space for reflection. A 7-metre-high (23 ft) audio-visual presentation of what is contained inside the exhibits is situated at the access point from the main foyer to the exhibition areas.

Other educational facilities within the building include the Military History Resource Centre, a museum library and archive; and the 236-seat Barney Danson Theatre. The war museum's theatre is named in honour of Barney Danson, in recognition of his efforts in supporting the Canadian War Museum. The building also includes a dedicated group entrance; a sunlit cafeteria along the riverfront portion of the building, with a seasonal terrace; dedicated climate-controlled vaults; and laboratories for on-site repairs of artifacts. Including all areas of the museum, the total gross floor area of the museum building is 40,860 square metres (439,800 sq ft).

== Exhibitions ==
The Canadian War Museum functions as a history museum, and as a "palace of memory". As a result, many of the museum's permanent exhibitions function as both educational exhibits, and as a memorial. Permanent exhibitions at the museum include the Canadian Experience Galleries, Memorial Hall, Regeneration Hall, and the Royal Canadian Legion Hall of Honour. The Canadian Experience Galleries are a series of four Canadian military history galleries arranged chronologically. Memorial Hall is the only exhibition that is free to the public, with Memorial Hall being accessible through the lobby.

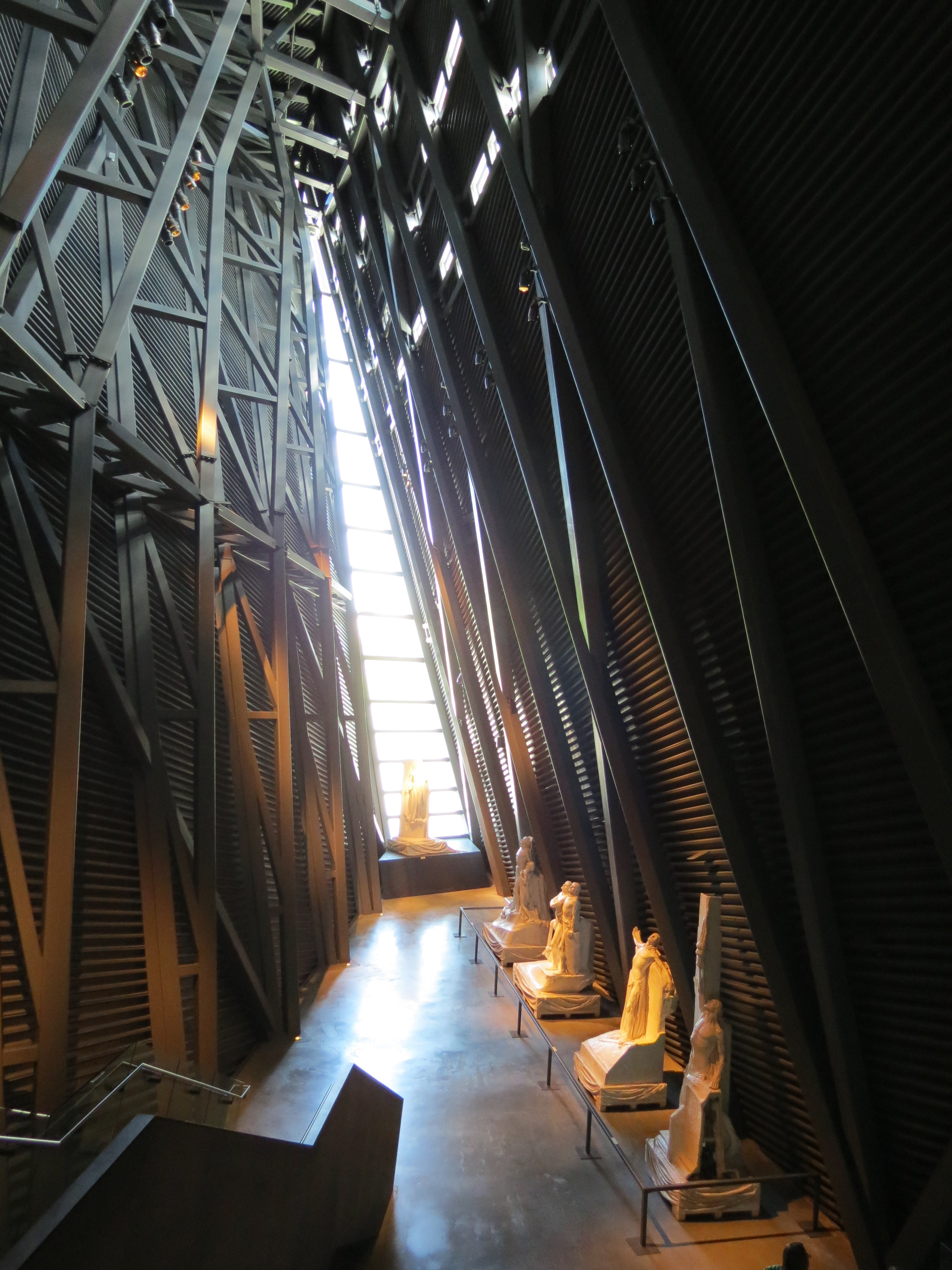
Regeneration Hall, one of several permanent exhibitions at the museum

The permanent exhibitions at the museum were designed by Haley Sharpe Design, based in Leicester, UK, and Origin Studios, based in Ottawa. The design team, together with museum historians, crafted its exhibits in which the themes of brutality, geography, politics, and survival are woven throughout most of the exhibitions in the museum. The museum permanent exhibitions are divided into seven zones, and further subdivided into 25 themed clusters. Graphic interpretive information is spread throughout the exhibits in order to convey textual and visual information to visitors.

Exhibition design teams worked in conjunction with the architectural team for the new museum building, providing the exhibition design team with greater influence in how the exhibitions were arranged, positioned, and shaped; a degree of architectural influence not available to exhibition design teams working to fit exhibits in a pre-existing space. The exhibit structures, like the building itself, is angular and trapezoidal, reflecting the museum's theme of regeneration, in addition to enhancing the themes of the exhibits. The exhibition areas in the museum feature austere lines of galvanized steel, concrete, wood, and other hard surfaces with strong, and deep colours. The exhibition areas' design was intended to provide visitors with "little comfort or respite," with the "fragmented structure of the exhibits," intended to the story of war. Although angular lines are prevalent throughout the design of the building and exhibitions, coloured curved structures are strategically placed throughout the galleries, acting as a counterpoint to the angular design of the building.

In addition to permanent exhibitions, the museum also organizes and hosts special and travelling exhibitions.

=== Canadian Experience galleries ===
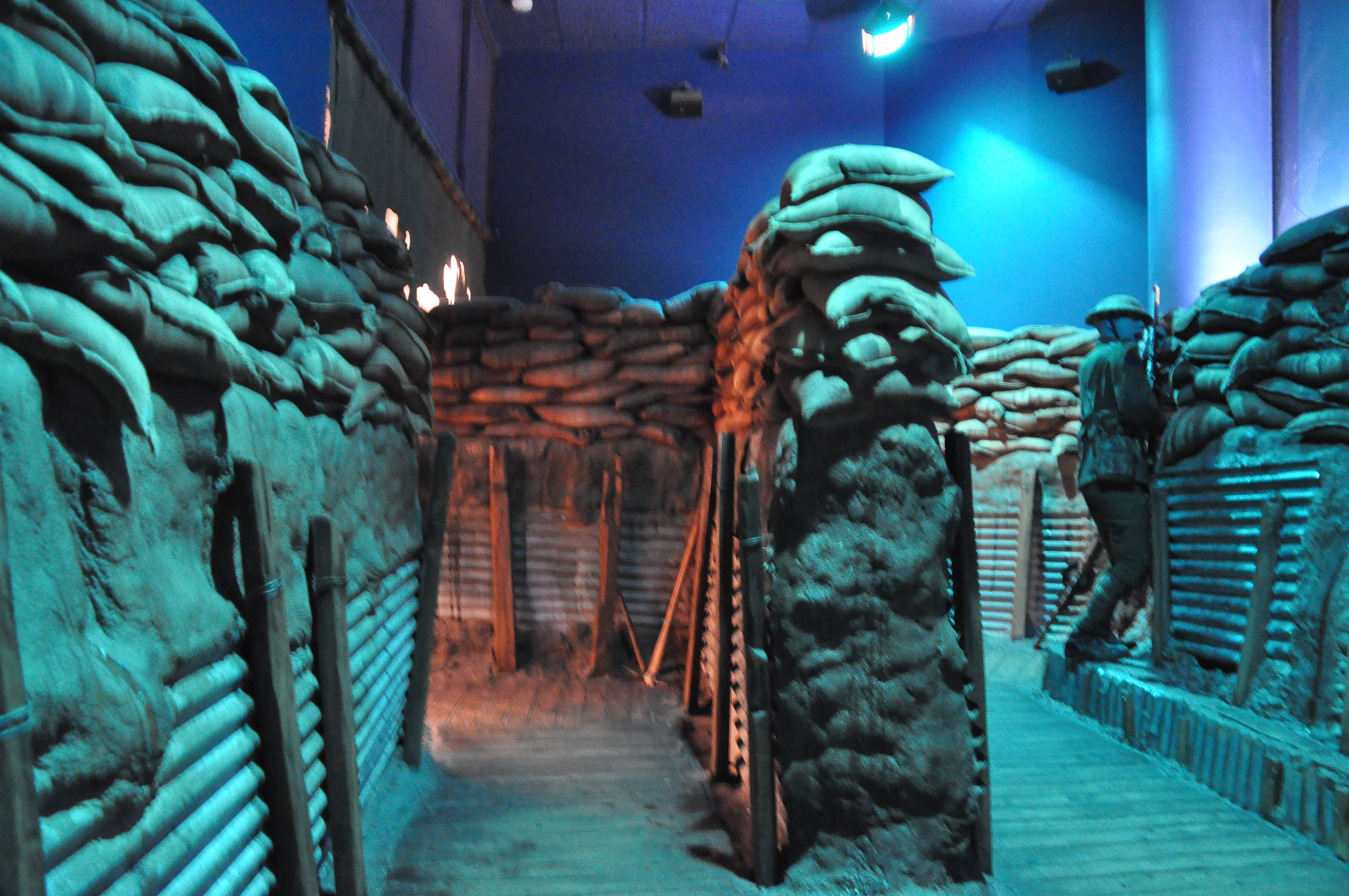
A life-sized trench diorama in the South African and the First World War gallery.

The Canadian Experience galleries are a collection of four galleries that take up 5,028 square metres (54,120 sq ft) of space. The four galleries document the military history of Canada, with the four galleries being Early Wars in Canada, South African and the First World War, Second World War, and From the Cold War to the Present. Although some galleries are centred around individual conflicts, events involving Canadians serve as the focus for the galleries, with other events during these conflicts only being briefly addressed.

The galleries were intended to "enhance the human experiences of war," documenting moments in Canadian military history that helped shape the country; with many of the exhibits drawing links to the events with larger themes of nationhood and national identity. Many of the exhibits were designed to simulate the "collective perspective" of Canadian service members, and Canadians in the homefront to a lesser extent. The galleries are themed after four "intertwined principles"—geography, brutality, politics, and survival—with each principle serving as the leading theme for a gallery. Visitors are introduced to these principles before entering the galleries, with conceptual phrases relating to these principles printed on the walls of the rotunda outside the entrance of the Canadian Experience galleries.

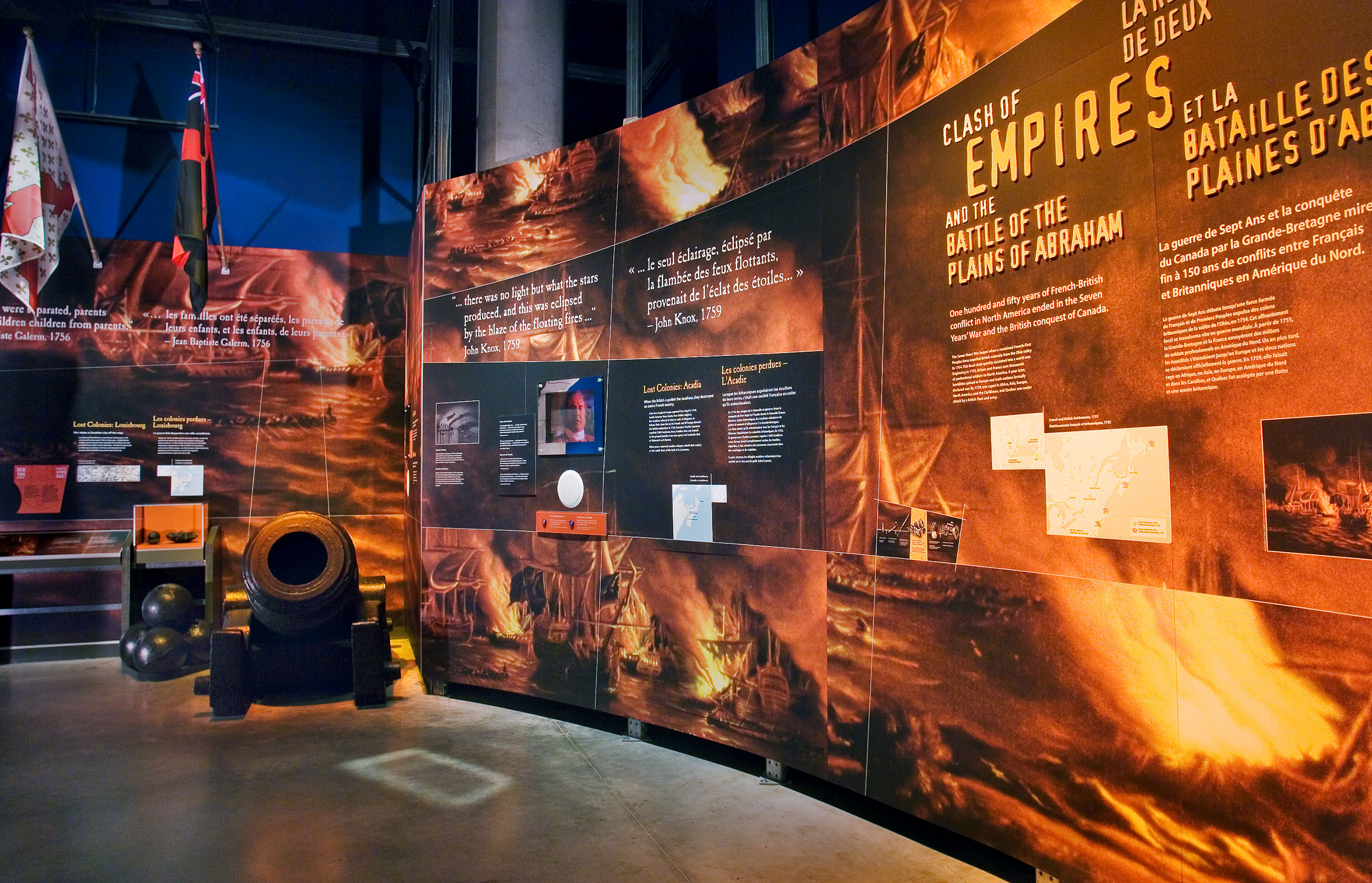
An exhibit on the Seven Years' War in the Early Wars in Canada gallery

The Early Wars in Canada gallery explores First Nations conflicts, as well as conflicts in New France and British North America, and post-confederated Canada in the 19th century. Many of the exhibits showcase how early conflicts in Canada were shaped by geography, and centred around lakes, streams, and rivers. Conflicts covered in this exhibit include the Beaver Wars, Anglo-French conflicts to the Seven Years' War, the American Revolutionary War, the War of 1812, the Fenian raids, and the North-West Rebellion.

The South African and the First World War gallery explores Canadian participation in the Second Boer War and the First World War. The South African and the First World War gallery is styled after Canada during Queen Victoria's diamond jubilee in 1897, intended to mimic the imperialistic fervour that existed during that period. In 2015, the museum opened a new portion of the gallery on the homefront during the First World War, highlighting the Conscription Crisis of 1917, the suffragette movement, and stories from individuals during the war.

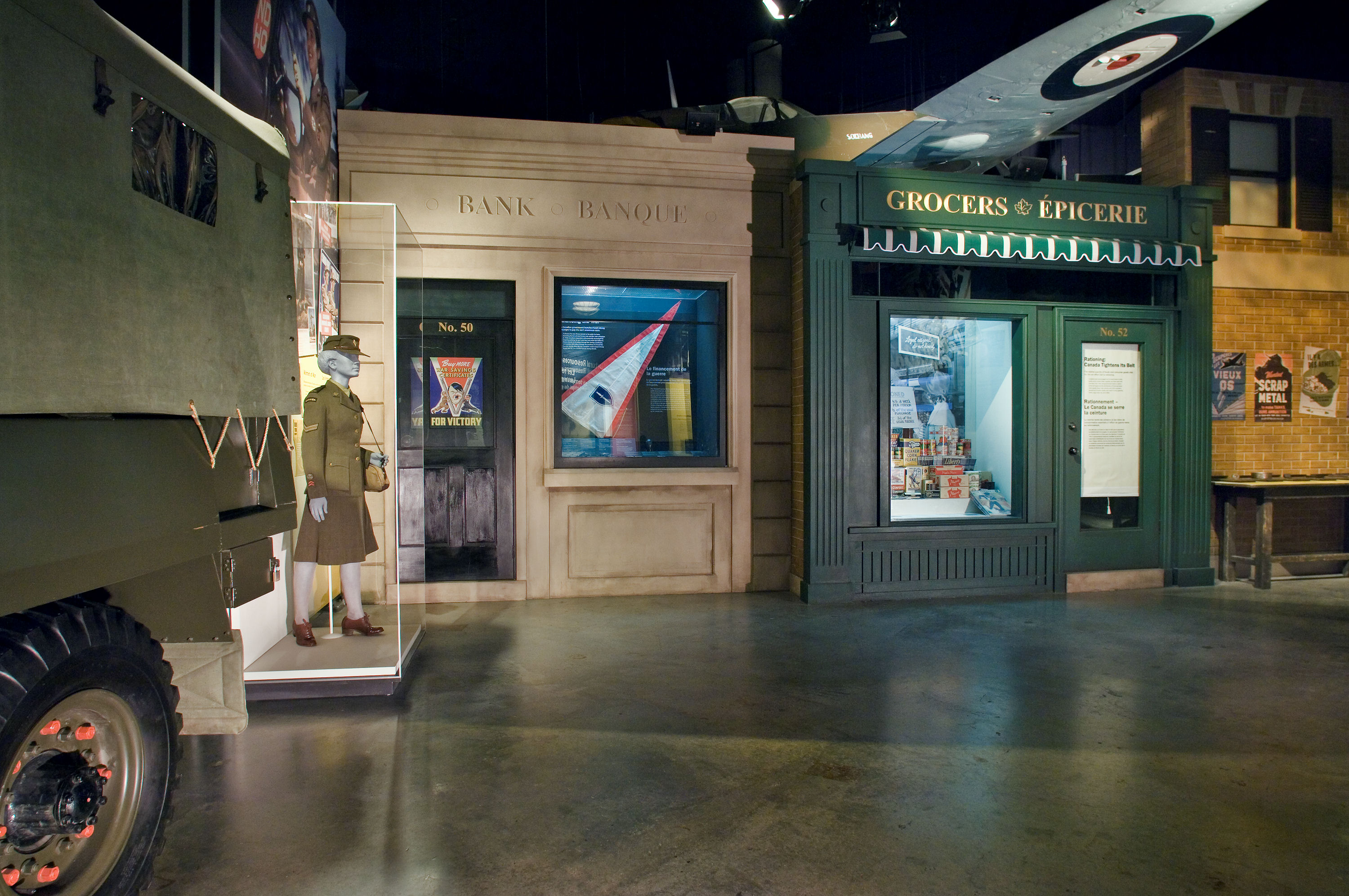
Exhibits of the homefront in the Second World War gallery

The Second World War gallery explores the causes of the Second World War, as well as Canada's participation during the conflict. Most of the Second World War exhibit focuses on Canada's role in the Battle of the Atlantic, the British Commonwealth Air Training Plan, the European theatre, the homefront, and the internment of Japanese Canadians. Small portions of the exhibit are also dedicated to Canadian participation in the Asian and Pacific theatre, and the Holocaust. Objects from the museum's collection exhibited in the Second World War portion of the Canadian Experience galleries includes a Mercedes-Benz 770K previously owned by Adolf Hitler, entitled Hitler's Car: A Symbol of Evil at the exhibit. The museum acquired the Mercedes Benz 770K in 1970, under the assumption that the car formerly belonged to Hermann Göring; a research report published in 1982 revealed that the vehicle had in fact belonged to Hitler. The gallery also houses an M4 Sherman tank named Forceful III, and is dedicated to the members of the Governor General's Foot Guards killed during the Second World War. A memorial plaque to Captain Thomas G. Fuller of the Royal Canadian Naval Volunteer Reserve is also present in the gallery.

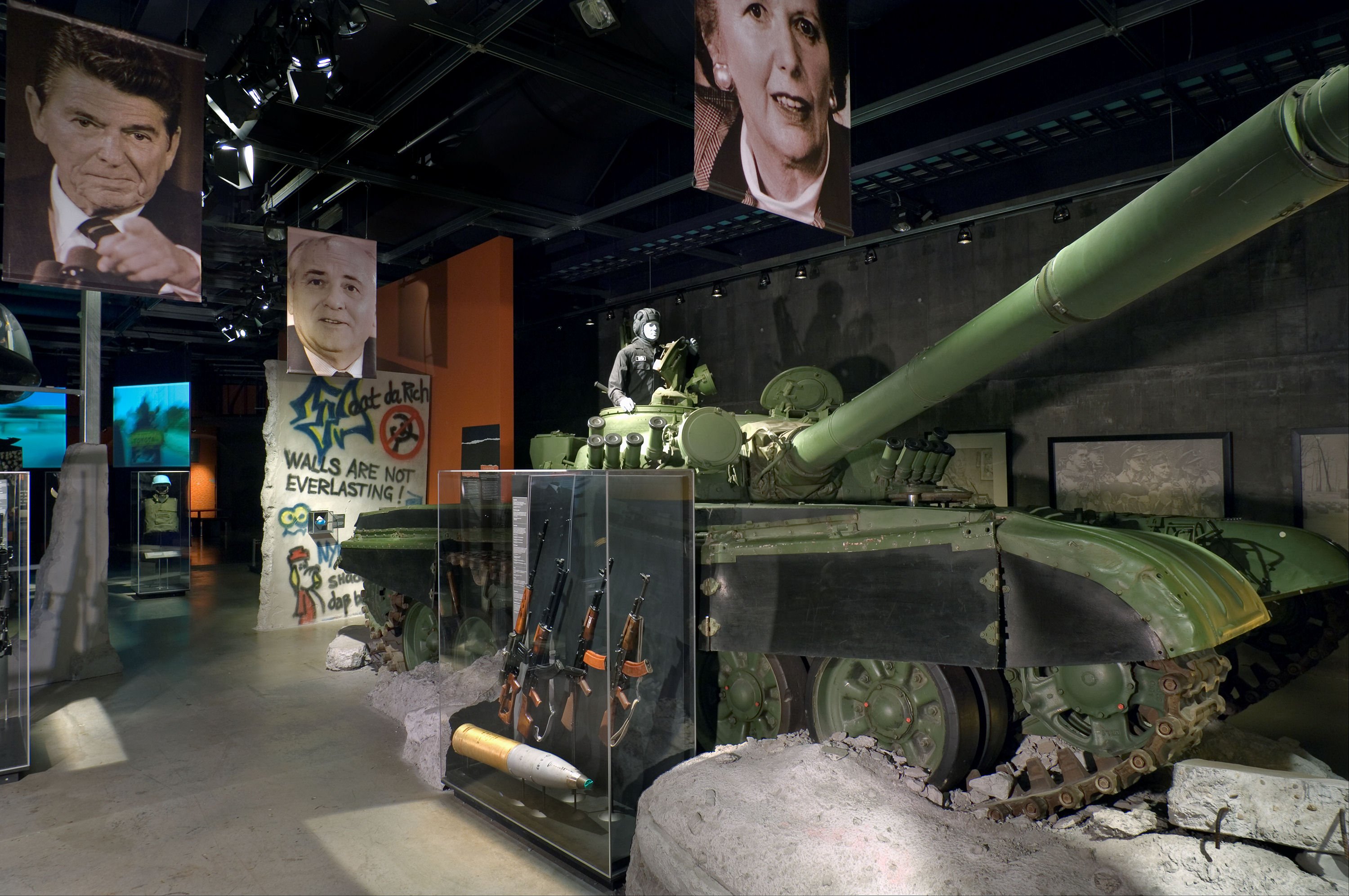
Artifacts on display in the From the Cold War to the Present gallery

The final gallery, From the Cold War to the Present, explores Canada's role during the Cold War, Canadian peacekeeping operations, and the threat of nuclear war in the public eye. In 2017, the concluding portion of the fourth gallery was updated to include post-Cold War conflicts involving members of the Canadian Armed Forces, including the War in Afghanistan. The final portion of the gallery was designed to confront visitors with the problematic nature of warfare, and features an interactive space for visitors to leave their own reflections on war, peace, and remembrance.

=== LeBreton Gallery ===
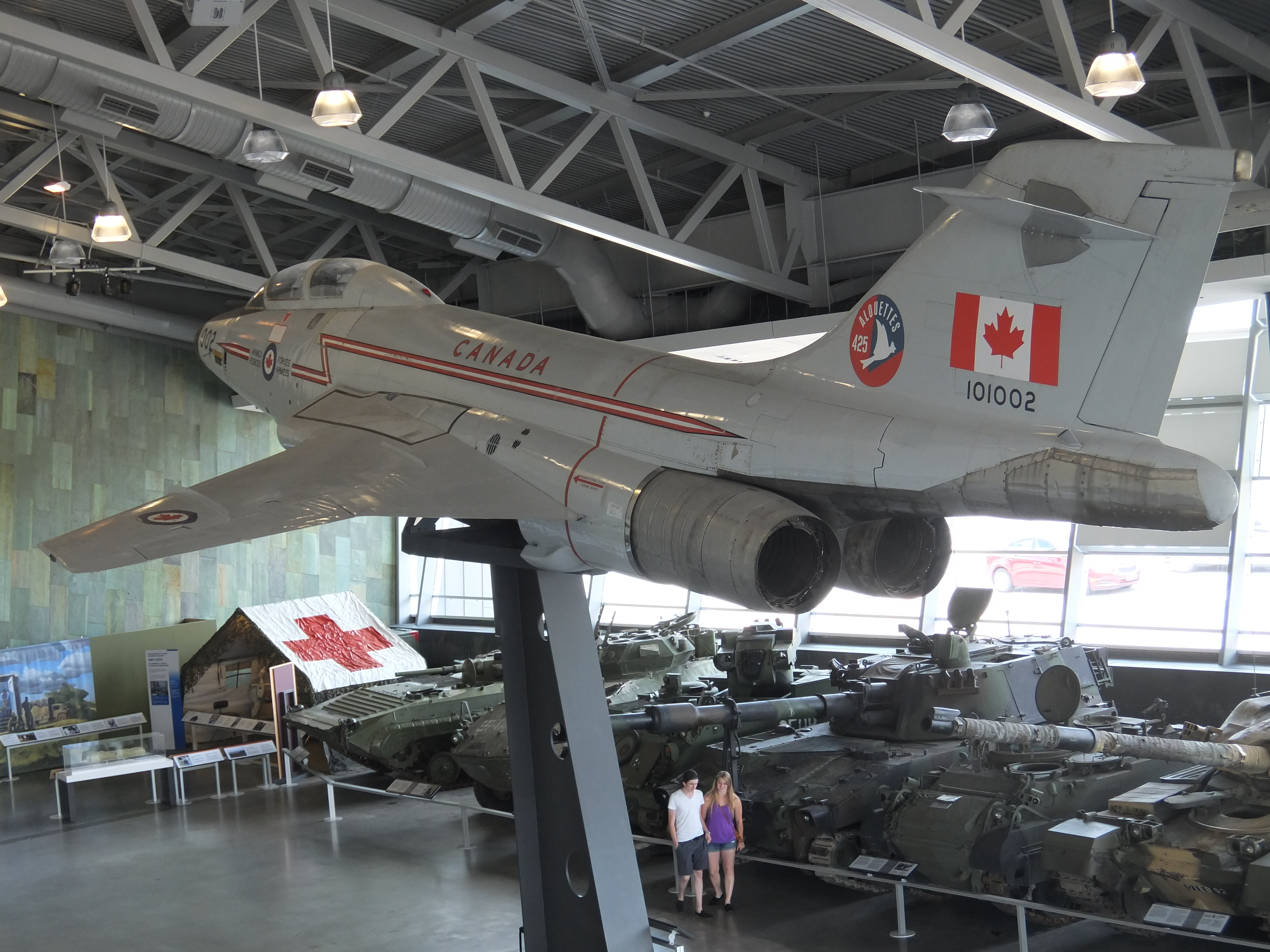
Military vehicles and equipment on display at the LeBreton Gallery

The LeBreton Gallery: The Military Technology Collection is an open-space gallery housing several items of military equipment used by Canadians or other military forces. Situated along the eastern portion of the museum, its eastern walls are made of glass, allowing natural sunlight to illuminate the gallery.

Equipment is organized into several sections, grouping land vehicles, aircraft and air equipment, sea vehicles and naval weapons, field artillery, cannons and mortars, armoured fighting vehicles, and tanks. Most of the equipment in the gallery has been restored and cleaned, arranged and organized with museum labels which provide details on the equipment. The museum labels accompanying the pieces are focused primarily on the technical aspects of the equipment. The equipment housed in LeBreton Gallery is among the largest items in the museum's collections and includes a McDonnell CF-101 Voodoo, 19th-century artillery pieces, a diverse array of tanks, and specialized-role military vehicles. The majority of the lighter wheeled and tracked transport vehicles on display date back to the Second World War and the Cold War.

=== Memorial Hall ===
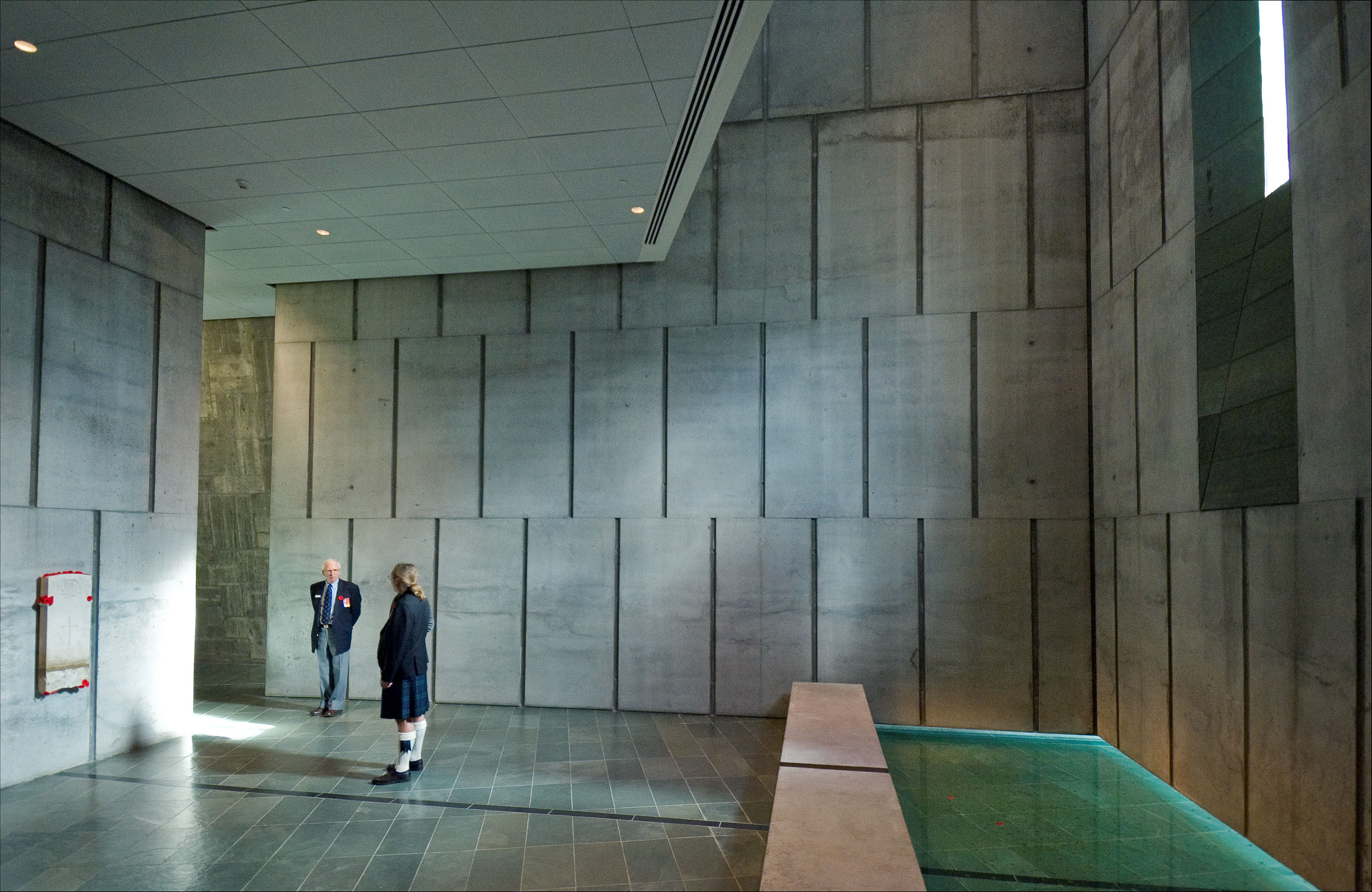
The interior of Memorial Hall. Its walls are made out of smooth concrete, and are arranged in a grid resembling First World War headstones

Situated within the lobby of the museum, Memorial Hall serves as a place for sombre reflection and remembrance. The exhibit's access point is angled upwards; with its doorway designed to provide an illusion of narrowness. The walls surrounding the access point are cladded in copper and are illuminated only by light fixtures installed in the floor, and a light mounted on the ceiling. The portion of the museum where Memorial Hall is situated is also aligned on an axis with the Peace Tower of the Canadian Parliament Buildings.

Conversely, the walls inside Memorial Hall are made out of smooth concrete, with only a grid pattern resembling the headstones used for Canadian First World War soldiers etched into the walls. The exhibit is illuminated by a skylight which extends beyond from the building's rooftop; while a glass-enclosed pool of water sits on the south side of Memorial Hall. The design of the exhibit was intended to provide visitors with the feeling of weightlessness. The exhibit contains a single artifact, the original headstone for the soldier eventually reburied at the Canadian Tomb of the Unknown Soldier. The hall was designed so that sunlight that passes through the hall's only window illuminates directly onto the headstone once a year, on 11 November at precisely 11 am, the time that the armistice that ended the First World War went into effect.

=== Regeneration Hall ===
Regeneration Hall is an exhibition located at the highest point of the museum building serving as a "physical representation of hope for a better tomorrow". The walls of Regeneration Hall are angled in a manner similar to the buildings on Parliament Hill, with the Peace Tower visible through the eastern glass façade of the exhibition. The exhibition holds several artworks, including the original models for the Canadian National Vimy Memorial, and the painting Sacrifice by Charles Sims.

=== Royal Canadian Legion Hall of Honour ===
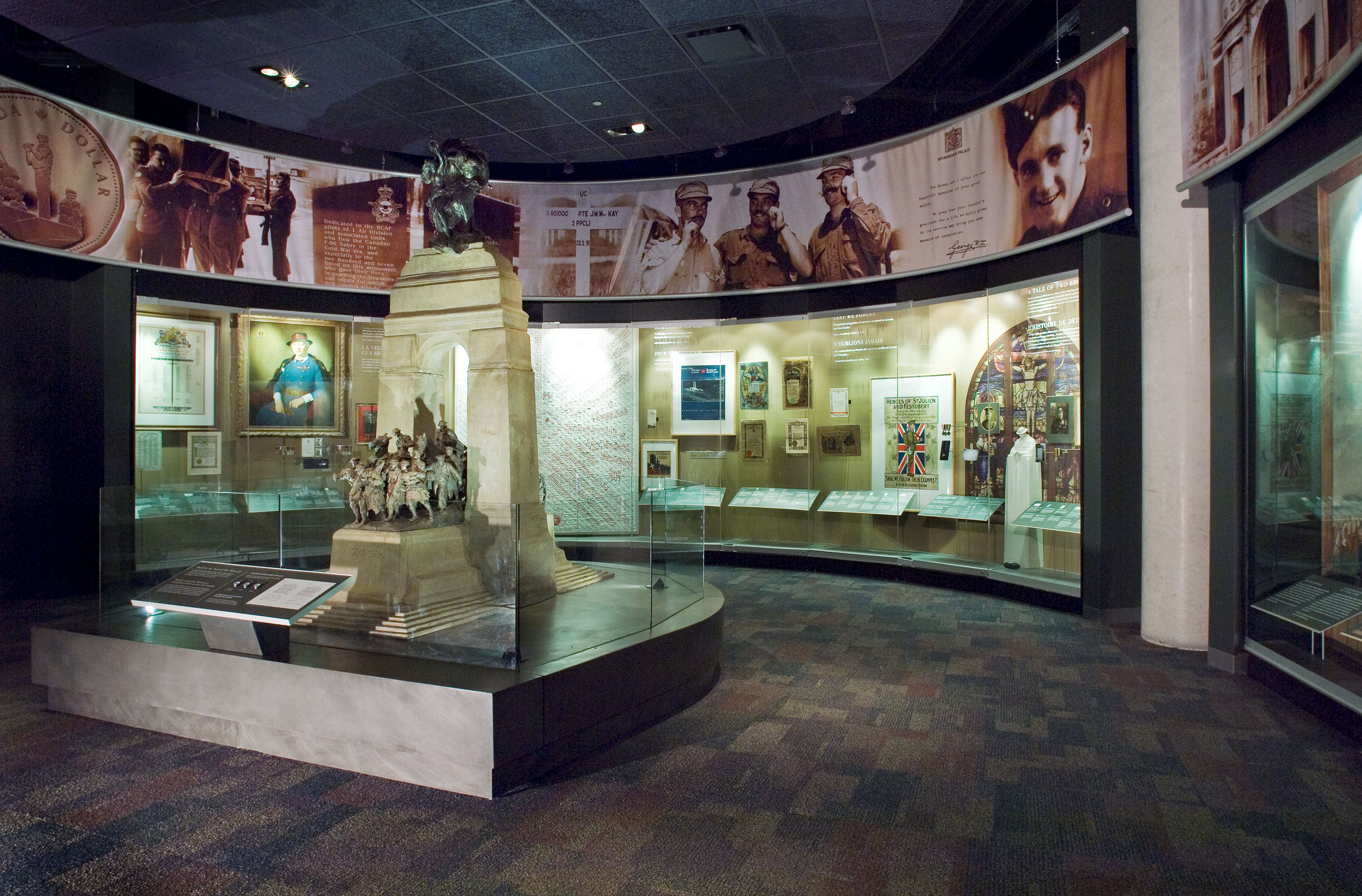
The Royal Canadian Legion Hall of Honour exhibit, with the original plaster design for the National War Memorial

The Royal Canadian Legion Hall of Honour is a 200 square metres (2,200 sq ft) oval-shaped exhibit which explores how Canadian military history has been commemorated and honoured throughout recorded history. The original plaster model that was submitted and later chosen in the National War Memorial design competition is exhibited in the centre of the Hall of Honour.

Floor-to-ceiling display cases containing certificates of service, letters, medals, models, paintings, photographs, rolls of honour, scrapbooks, and souvenirs are situated along the walls of the exhibit. The exhibits are displayed chronologically and include items relating to First Nations, New France, British North America, and confederated Canada. However, the majority of the displays are dedicated to exhibiting items from the 20th century. Items in these displays, along with the individual stories corresponding to each chronological period are exhibited in an attempt to convey the various forms of commemorating the war dead throughout Canadian history.

== Collection ==
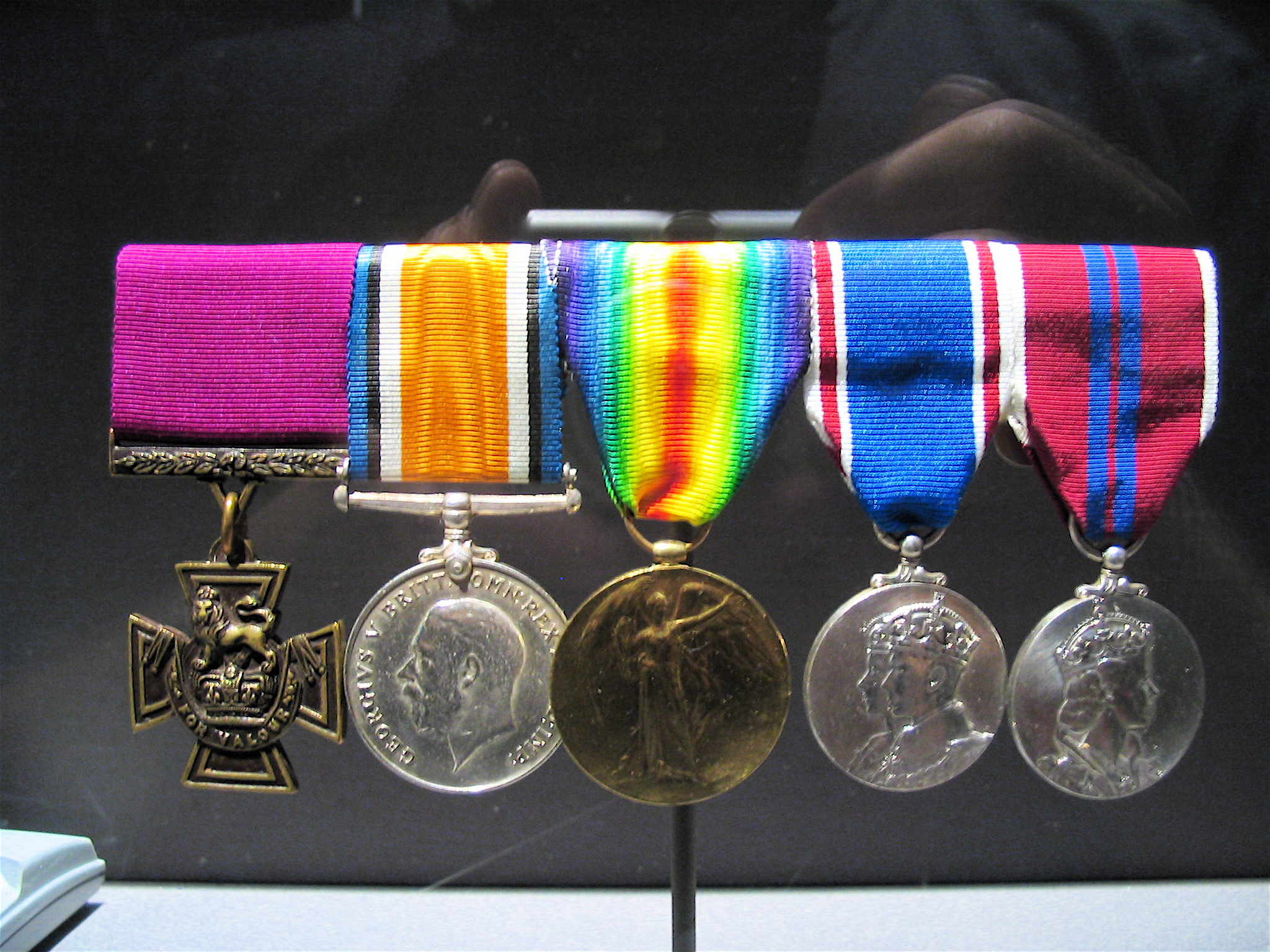
Canadian military medals from the museum's collection on display

As of 2015, the museum's collection includes over 500,000 pieces. The collection includes correspondences, documents, equipment, maps, medals, military art, military vehicles, and military uniforms. On average, the museum receives 700 offers for donations a year, including individual items or large collections; although, the museum only accepts 100 to 150 of these offers annually. However, Canadian service medals and medals of valour are accepted by the museum unconditionally, as an "act of honouring". Approximately 2,000 artworks and photographs from the museum's collection are used throughout the museum exhibits; although 500 of these images are enlarged versions of originals.

Items from the museum's collection are either displayed in the museum's exhibits, on tour with travelling exhibitions, loaned out to other institutions, or housed in the museum storage area. From 1967 to 2004, items not on display were stored in off-site facilities; with the Dominion Archives' Trophy Building used as storage from 1967 to 1983, and Vimy House used as storage from 1983 to 2004. During the 20th century, archival materials belonging to the war museum were also held in a warehouse in ByWard Market. In 2004, the museum ceased operating these off-site storage facilities, after it relocated items held there to a new storage space within the new museum building.

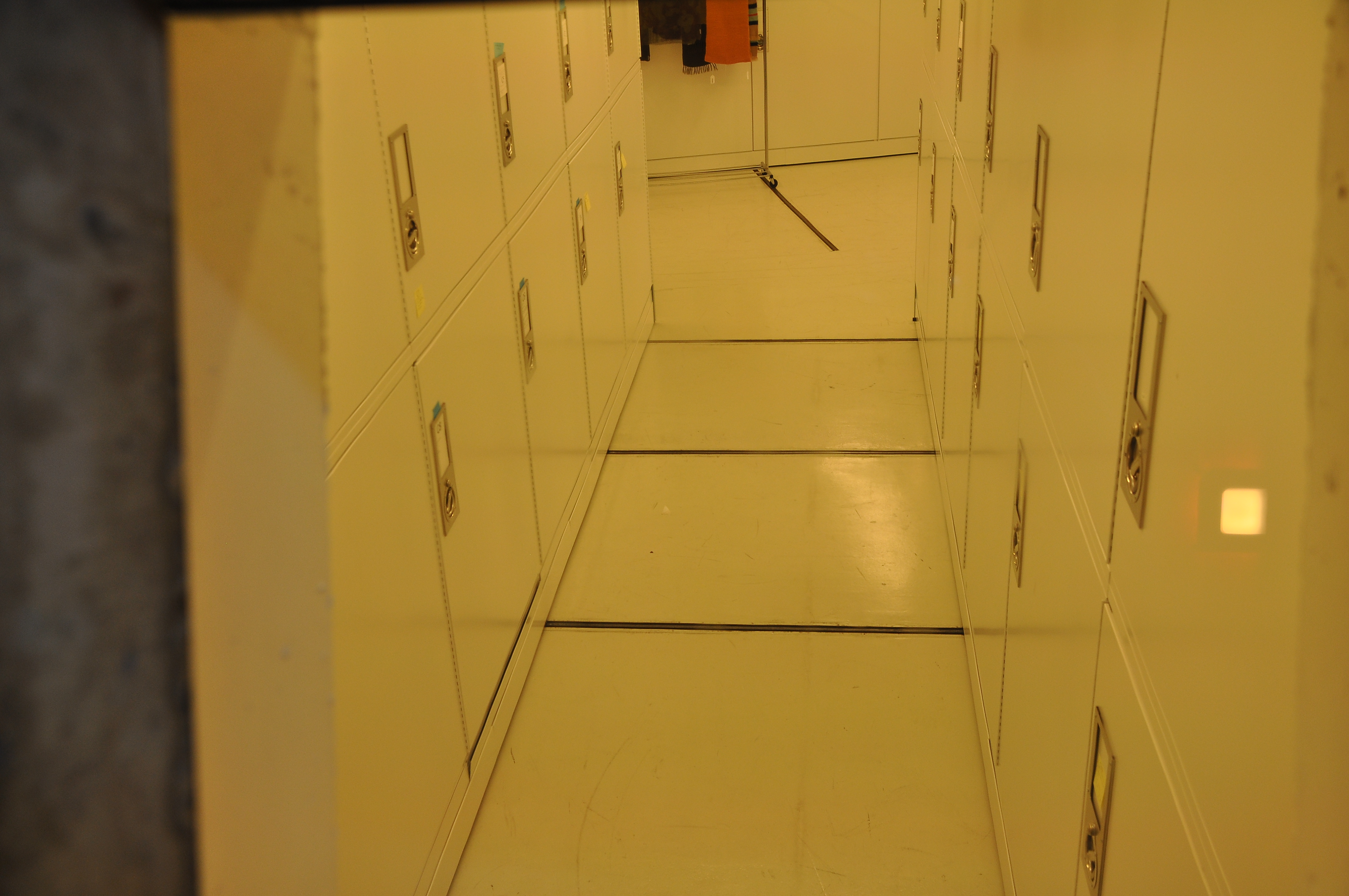
Storage units in the museum's collections vault. The vault holds items from the museum's collection not on display in its exhibits or on loan.

The museum's collection originated from the artifacts and archival materials originally held at Cartier Square Military Museum in 1880; including an assortment of weapons; a bell from HMS Neptune, the flagship for Admiral Charles Saunders during the 1759 siege of Quebec; and the colours for the Royal Highland Emigrants, and various units from the War of 1812. The collection grew in size during the First World War, with materials from the war transported back to Canada. Following the end of World War II in Europe, the museum dispatched its first collections acquisition team to the Netherlands and Allied-occupied Germany to acquire a large number of German military equipment. During the Cold War, the museum's collection continued to expand with the Canadian Armed Forces transferring its obsolete equipment, as well as examples of enemy equipment to the museum. During the 1990s, the museum also began to acquire a number of materials as gifts from several post-Soviet states.

In 1994, the museum's collection held approximately 6,550 posters; with 3,770 posters originating from Canada, 692 from the United Kingdom, 612 from the United States, and the remaining from a variety of countries in Europe, and Australia. In 2019, 39 of the 99 original Victoria Crosses that were awarded to Canadians are held in the collections of the Canadian War Museum. (Note: Original Victoria Crosses refer to Victoria Crosses issued to Canadians prior to the creation of the Canadian Victoria Cross in 1993.)

=== War art ===
As of 2015, the museum's Beaverbrook Collection of War Art contained over 13,000 pieces of military art. The majority of the war artworks in the collection are on paper, although these works are less often used in museum exhibits than their on canvas counterparts. The museum has been invested in several Canadian war art programs since 1971, after the National Gallery of Canada handed over management of the Canadian War Memorial Fund, and over 5,000 works from its Canadian War Records Collections to the war museum; including all of its war art from the Second World War. The museum's military art collection takes its name from Max Aitken, 1st Baron Beaverbrook, who established the art collection that later became the Canadian War Records. Although the museum's war art collection included over 13,000 works, only 64 of these pieces depicted a dead body as of 2017.

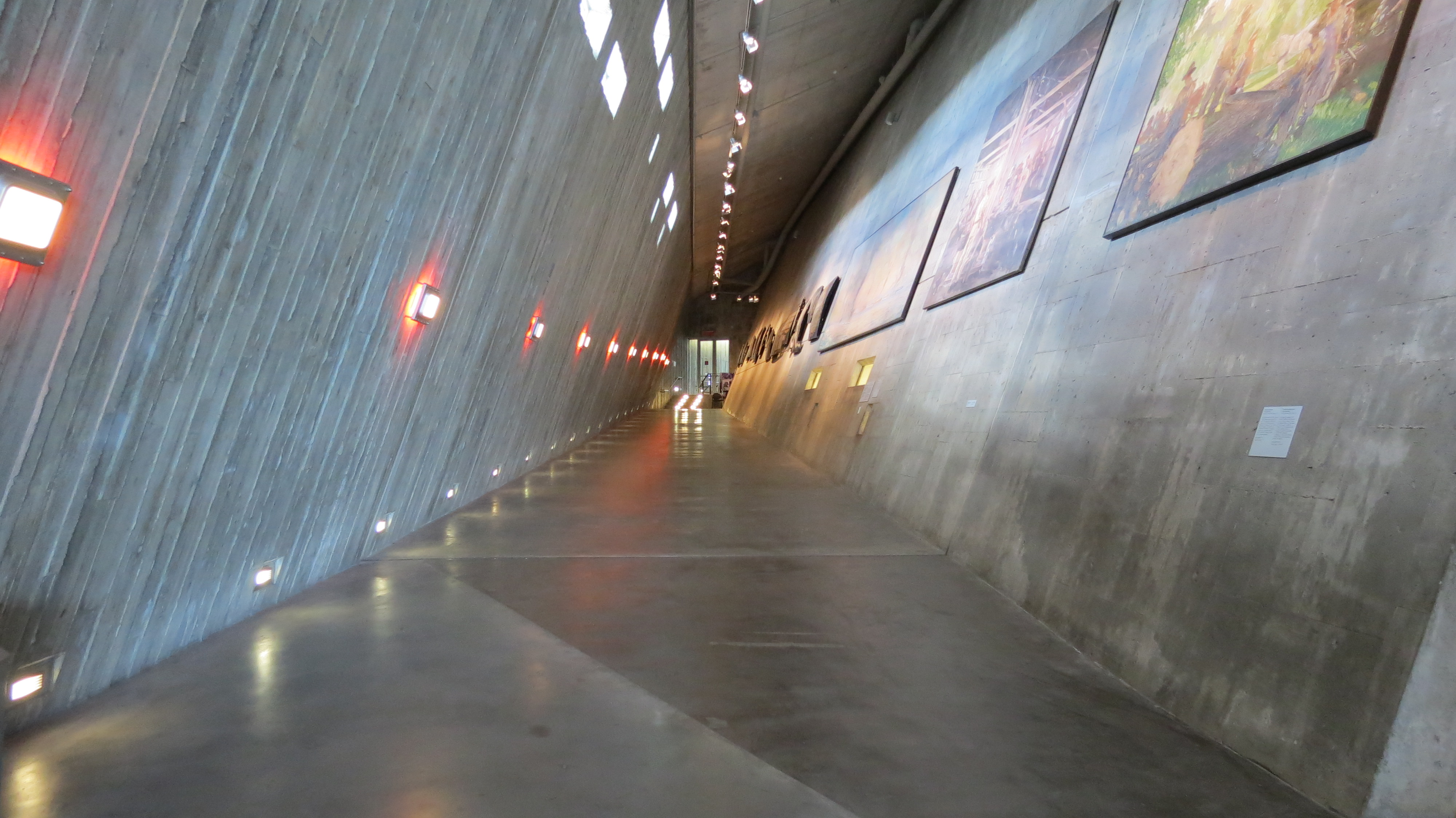
Military art from the museum's collection on display

The museum's collection of war art includes over 400 works by Alex Colville. Other artists featured in the collection include Caroline Armington, Alfred Bastien, Charles Comfort, Alma Duncan, Colin Gill, Bobs Cogill Haworth, Robert Stewart Hyndman, Richard Jack, Frank Johnston, Manly E. MacDonald, Pegi Nicol MacLeod, Mabel May, Jack Nichols, Charles Sims, and Frederick Varley. The collection also includes several models and statues, including the plaster model by Vernon March that was later selected as the design for the National War Memorial. The museum's collection also includes the original scale plaster models by Walter Seymour Allward for the Canadian National Vimy Memorial. From 1937 to 2000, the models were held in storage, before they were exhibited in an exhibition in 2000. The models are now used in the Regeneration Hall exhibition.

Major travelling exhibitions of war art organized by the Canadian War Museum include A Terrible Beauty: The Art of Canada at War (1977), curated by the Canadian War Museum and Heather Robertson; and Canvas of War: Masterpieces from the Canadian War Museum, which toured Canada between 1999 and 2004 and was seen by nearly half a million visitors.

In 2007, the Canadian War Museum highlighted contemporary women's perspectives on war in the exhibitions War Brides: Portraits of an Era (an installation by Calgary artist Bev Tosh) and Stitches in Time (the work of London, Ontario artist Johnnene Maddison).

==== Selected works ====
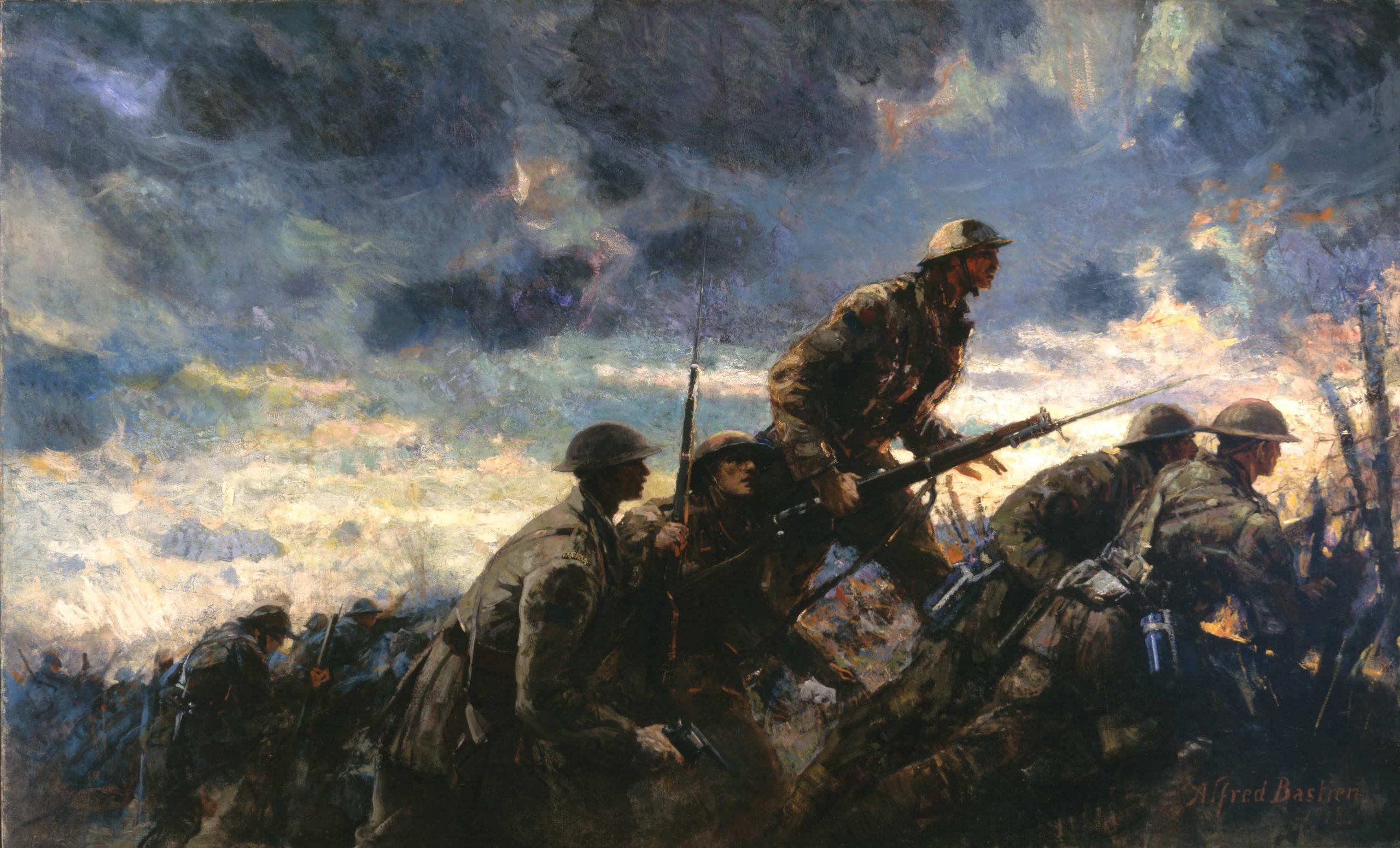
Over the Top, Neuville-Vitasse, by Alfred Bastien, 1918

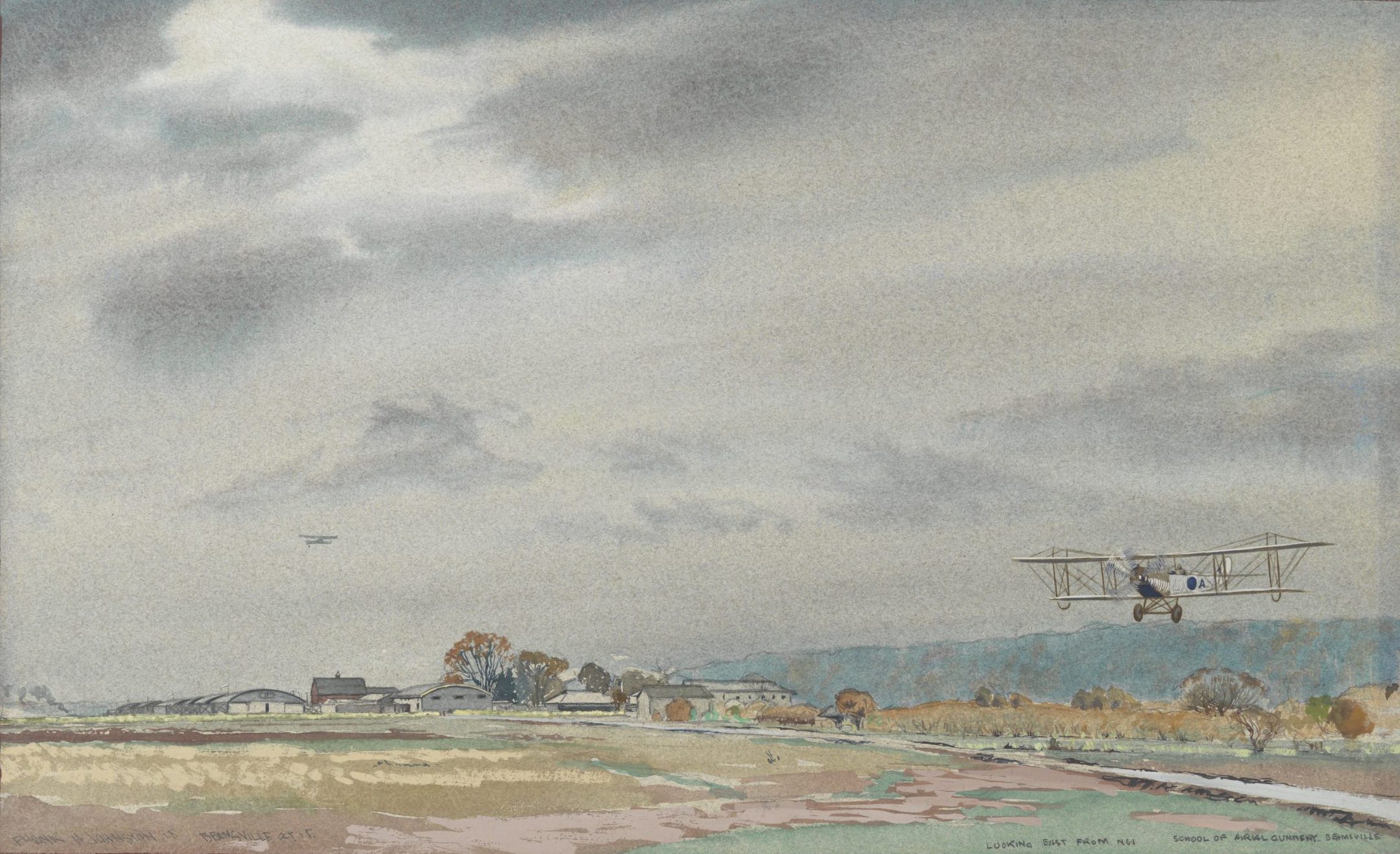
School of Gunnery, Beamsville, by Frank Johnston, 1918

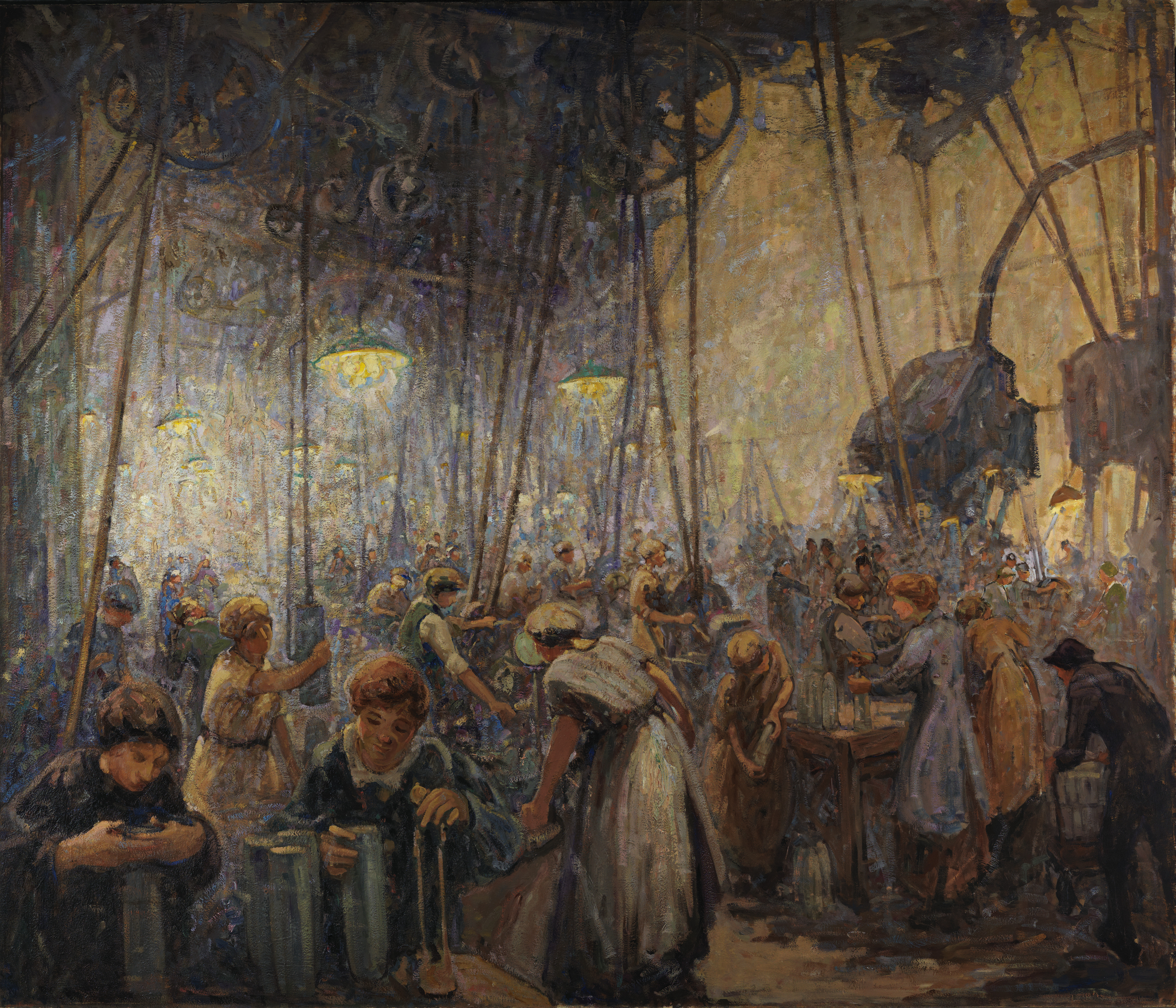
Women Making Shells, by Mabel May, 1918

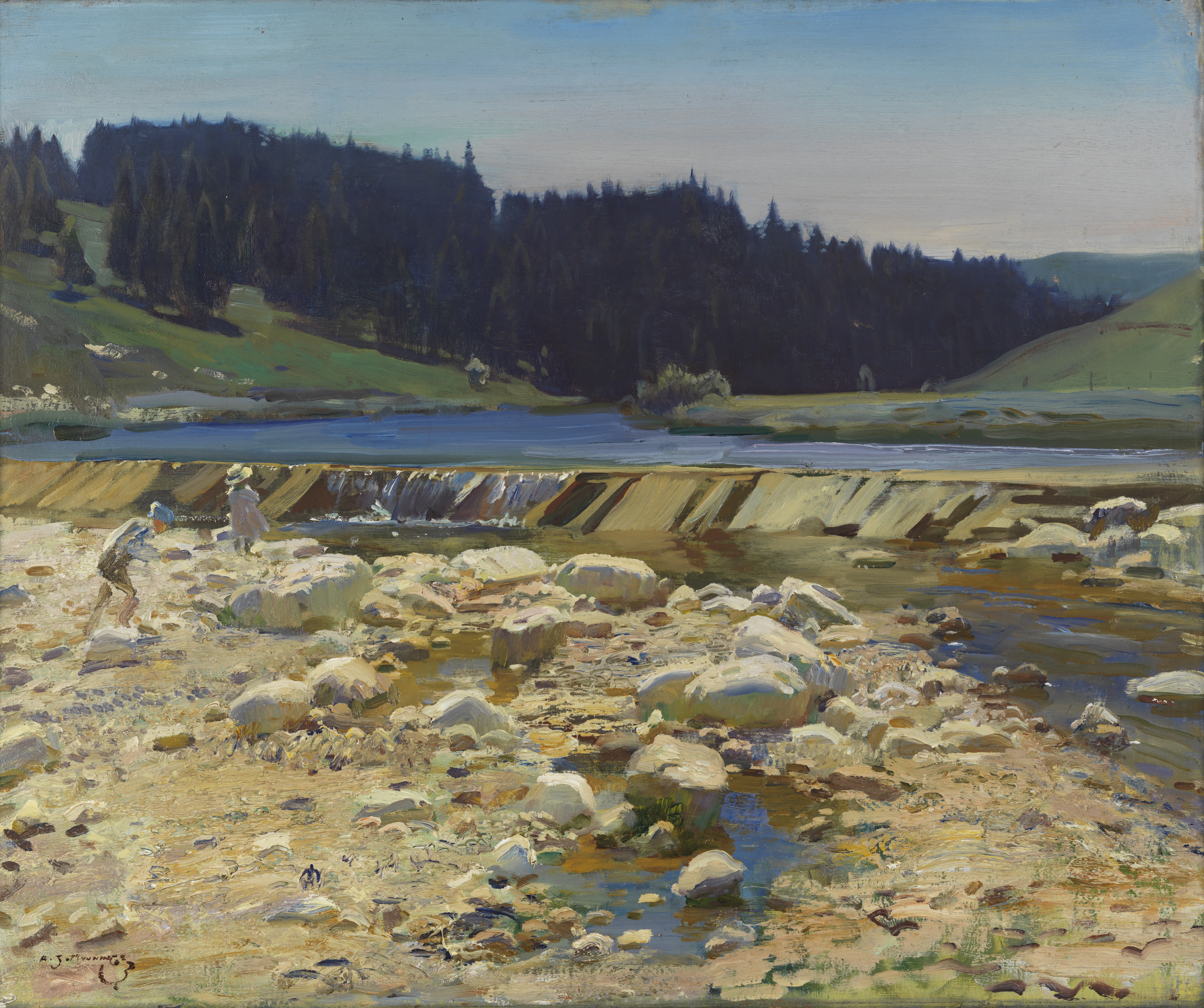
A Stream Bed at Labergement Jura Forest, by Alfred Munnings, 1918

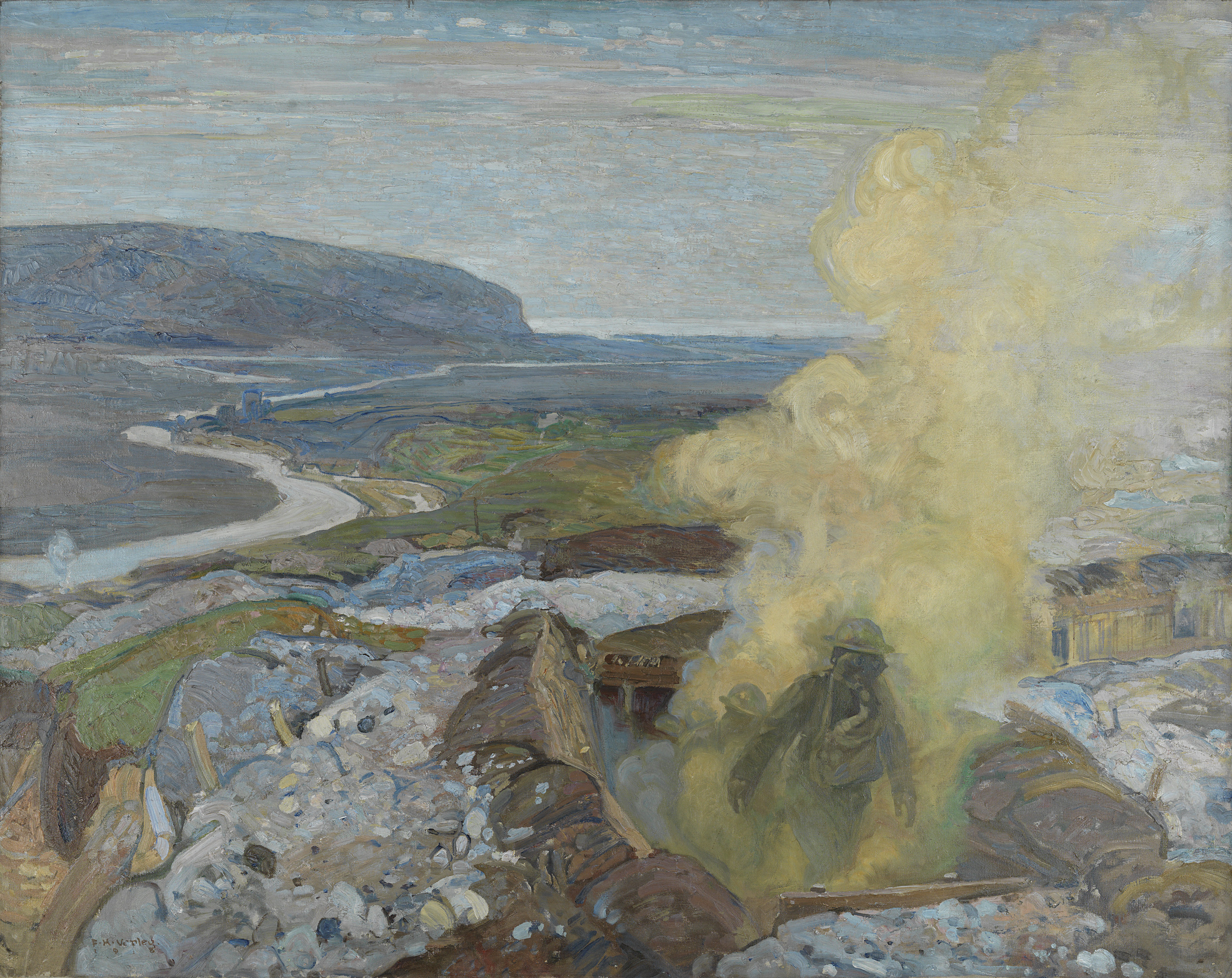
Gas Chambers at Seaford by Frederick Varley, 1918

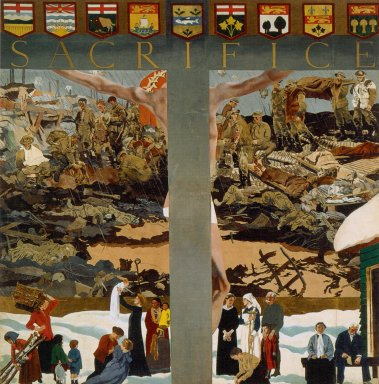
Sacrifice, by Charles Sims, 1917–1919

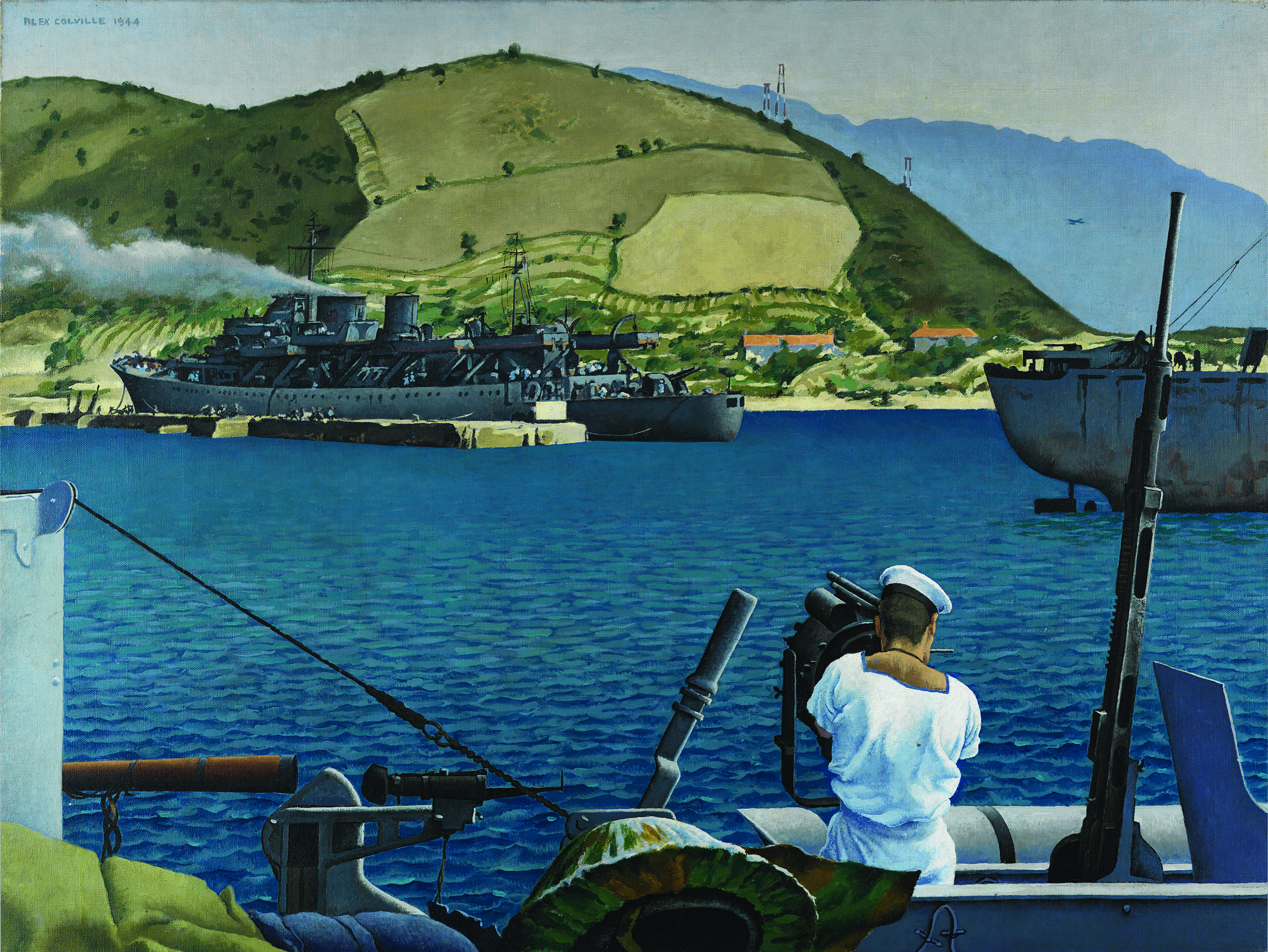
His Majesty's Canadian Ship Prince Henry in Corsica, by Alex Colville, 1944

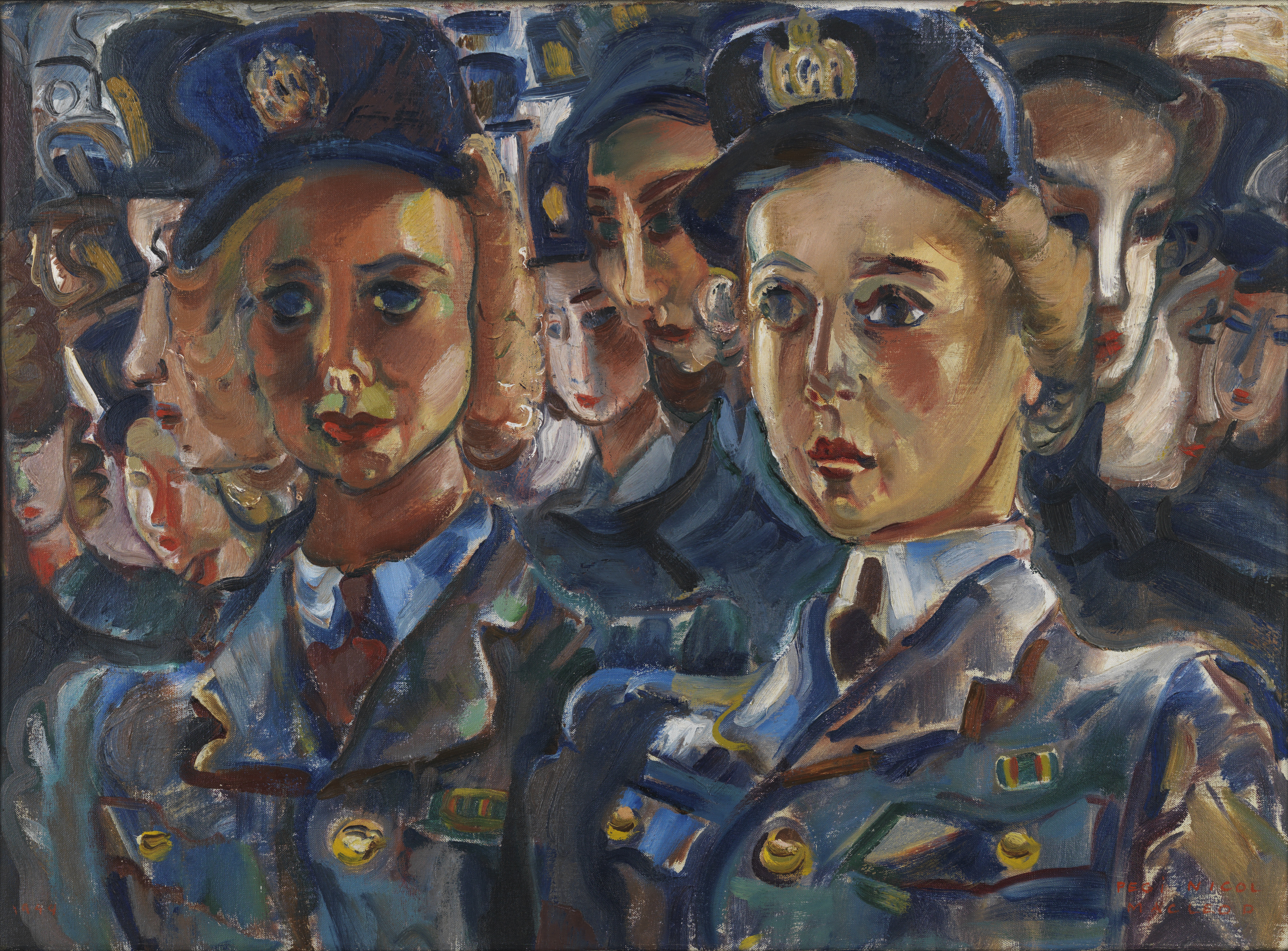
Untitled, Pegi Nicol MacLeod, 1944

== Library and archives ==
The Military History Research Centre is a facility in the museum that houses the Hartland Molson Library Collection, and the George Metcalf Archival Collection. The Hartland Molson Library Collection serves as the museum's reference collection on Canadian military history, materials, and rare books; whereas George Metcalf Archival Collection serves as an archive for blueprints, daguerreotypes, films, journals, logbooks, maps, photographs, scrapbooks, and tapes. The research centre includes a general reading area that overlooks the adjacent river, and a specialized reading room for more fragile materials.

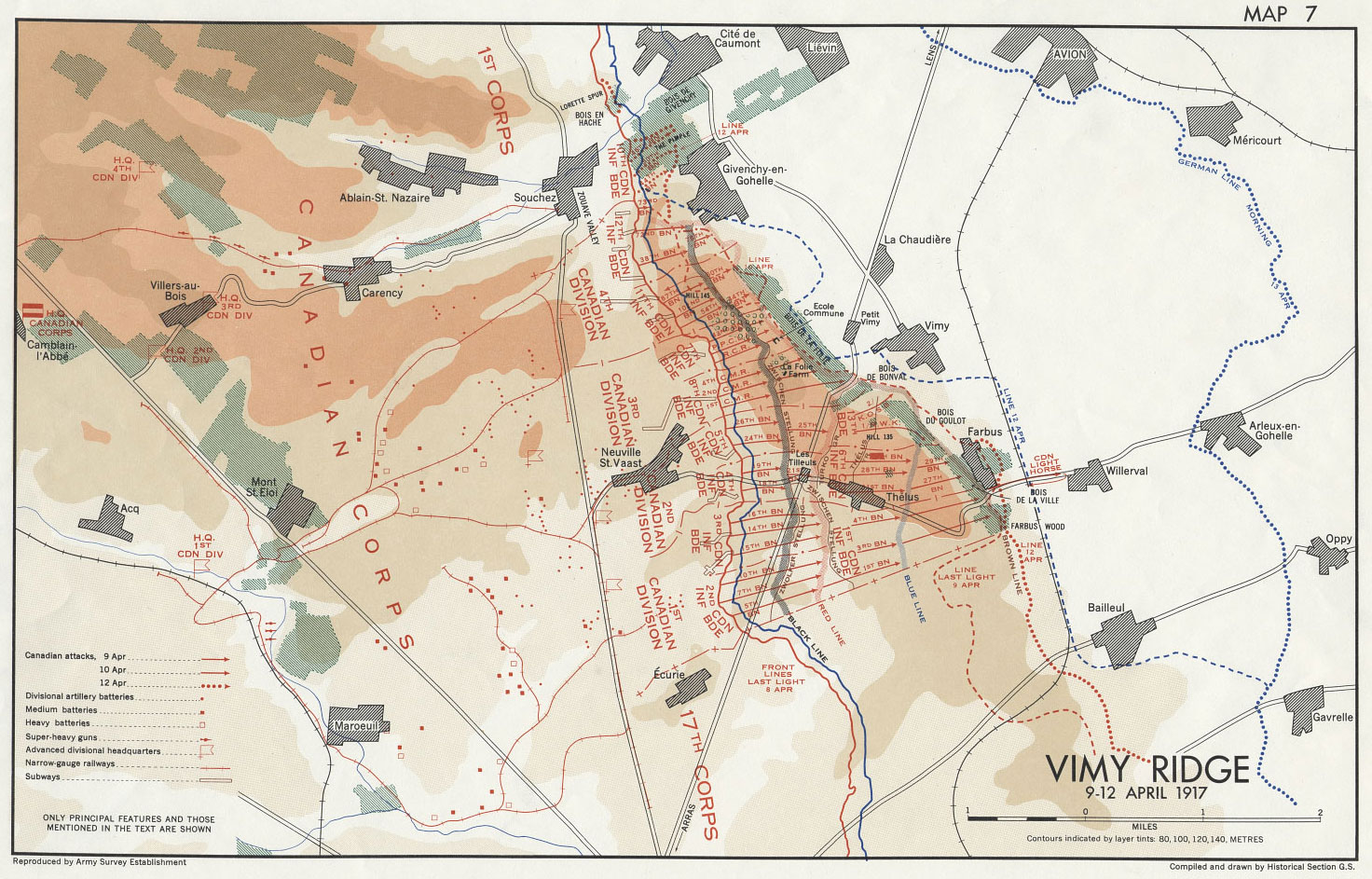
Depiction of the Canadian Corps' advance during the Battle of Vimy Ridge; drawn by the Historical Section of the General Staff, 1917. The map is one of a number of cartographical materials held in the museum's archives.

Although the War Trophies Review Board initially planned for the museum to include an archive, the museum did little archival work until 1967. The archiving of war-related documents was primarily undertaken by the Public Archives of Canada up until that point; although the Public Archives voluntarily turned over war materials sent to the archives to the war museum. After the closure of the Public Archive's history museum in 1967, materials and documents from the museum were split between the National Museum of Man (now the Canadian Museum of History), and the Canadian War Museum. As a result of the closure of the Public Archive's history museum, the Public Archives began to regularly transfer archival documents to the war museum. In 1982, the museum's archival collection was reorganized into several categories, souvenirs, museum, manuscripts, maps, plans and blueprints, and Canadian War Museum records.

The Military History Research Centre's oral history archive contained nearly 400 interviews in 2007. The oral history collection was started by the museum in 1999. The program devised topic lists to guide interviews toward certain areas of interest; although the framing of the topics is designed to allow for in-depth conversation, one free of bias. Interviews were either conducted by the museum's research team, or ex-military officers and averaged 90 minutes in length. Subjects of interviews include service members who served in the Second World War, United Nations Emergency Force, Canadian Forces Europe, Yugoslav Wars, and the War in Afghanistan. Specific subjects interviewed include Airborne Intercept Navigators in NATO and NORAD, deputy commanders of NORAD, and all former Canadian commanders of STANAVFORLANT.

In 2000, the museum's photographic archives contained over 600 photograph collections or fonds; holding more than 17,000 individual photographs, and more than 250 photo albums. The collection was largely obtained through private sources, most of whom had taken the photo as participants in these conflicts.

== Arms ==
Coat of arms of the Canadian War Museum
Adopted 1999 Crest Out of a mural coronet Argent masoned Gules two arms in armour embowed in-wards Argent the hands holding an open book proper bound Gules Escutcheon Argent masoned and thereon a poppy flower Gules seeded Vert on a chief embattled Gules a key wards to the dexter and downwards Or Supporters On either side of a grassy mound Vert thereon poppy flowers and maple leaves Gules and maple seeds Or a winged sea ram per fess dancetty Argent and Gules armed langued unguled and finned Or Motto HONORES AD MEMORIAM (Latin for 'Honours for memory') Banner A banner of the Arms, viz. Argent masoned and thereon a poppy flower Gules seeded Vert on a chief embattled Gules a key wards to the dexter and downwards Or Badge Per fess embattled Gules and Argent masoned Gules in chief a key wards to the dexter and downwards Or all within an annulus Gules fimbriated and inscribed with the name of the Museum in English and French and surrounded by maple leaves Or and poppy flowers Gules seeded Vert resting on a scroll inscribed with the Museum Motto and ensigned by a mural coronet Argent masoned Gules

== See also ==
- Lest We Forget Project
- List of military museums
- List of museums in Ottawa
- National museums of Canada
- National War Memorial (Canada)
- Organization of Military Museums of Canada
- Victor Suthren, former director general of the museum
