= Paul E. Garber Preservation, Restoration, and Storage Facility =

Facility for the National Air and Space Museum

Coordinates: 38°50′29.92″N 76°56′35.99″W

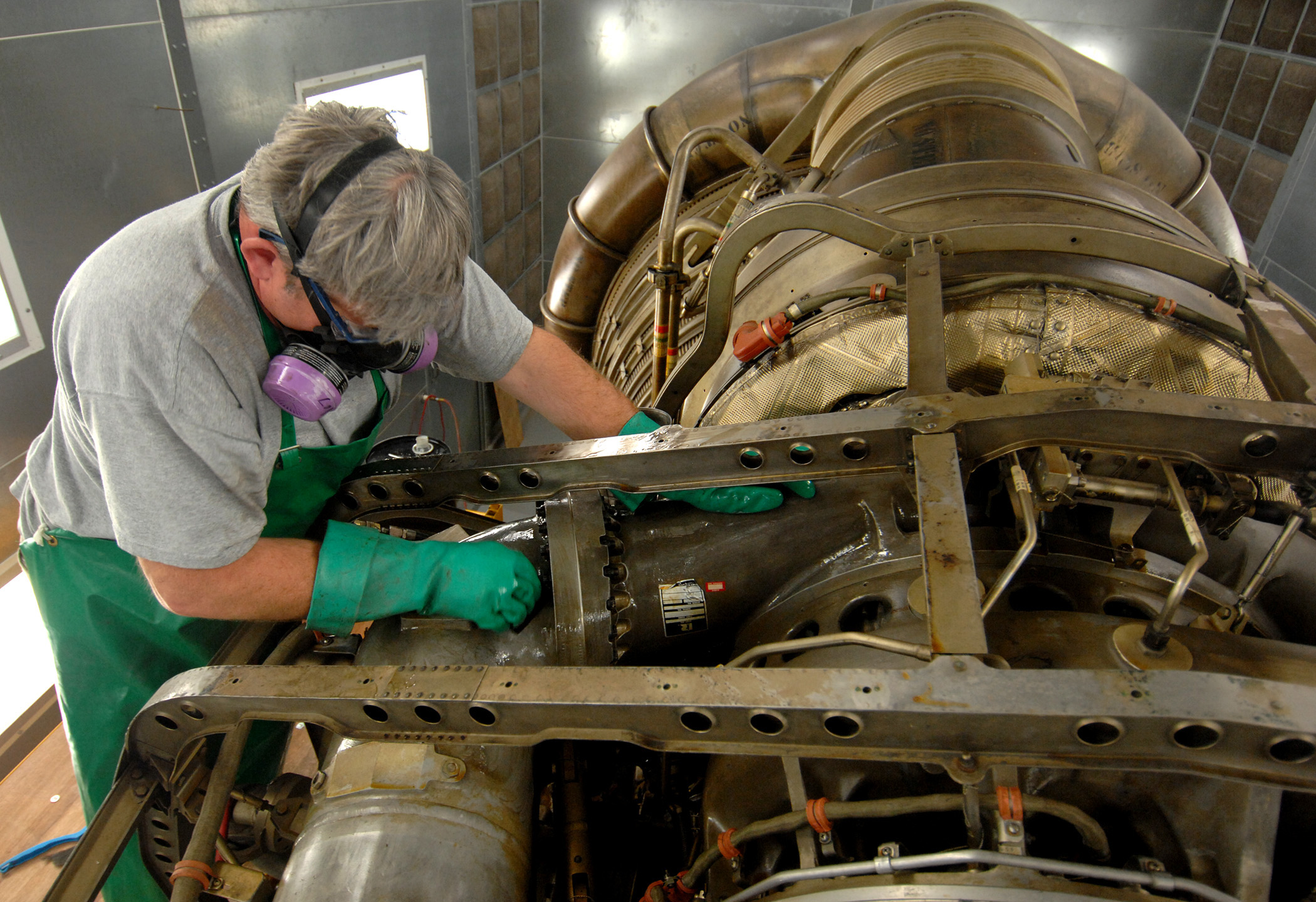
Retired Senior Chief Aviation Machinist's Mate Scott Wood carefully restores a Saturn V F-1 rocket engine to its original condition

The Paul E. Garber Preservation, Restoration, and Storage Facility, also known colloquially as "Silver Hill", is a storage and former conservation and restoration facility of the Smithsonian National Air and Space Museum, located in Suitland, Maryland, United States. Located adjacent to the Museum Support Center – a facility that serves the same purpose for other Smithsonian museums – the Paul E. Garber Facility was once the main artifact restoration facility of the National Air and Space Museum. The museum still stores aircraft and other artifacts at the Paul E. Garber Facility, but most storage and restoration functions have relocated to the Mary Baker Engen Restoration Hangar at the Steven F. Udvar-Hazy Center in Chantilly, Virginia. The facility is not open to the public.

It opened to the public for tours in January 1977. It was named in honor of Paul E. Garber in 1980, a Smithsonian curator who devoted most of his career to maintaining a collection of historic aircraft. It was created in the early 1950s by Garber to store, protect the museum's growing collection of World War II aircraft and provide space to restore them. The facility consists of 32 metal buildings. 19 of those buildings are devoted to storage of airplanes, spacecraft, engines, and various parts awaiting restoration. One building formerly housed a large restoration shop, and three buildings are for exhibition creation.

Public tours of the facility stopped at the end of March 2003.

To date, the largest restoration project undertaken by the Garber Facility was the B-29 Superfortress, Enola Gay. Work began in 1984. The fuselage alone took 10 years of work. The aircraft was finally delivered to the Steven F. Udvar-Hazy Center in 11 tractor trailer loads over the space of three months in 2003.

Approximately 65 space suits from the Mercury, Apollo, and other U.S. space programs were formerly stored at the facility in an environmentally-controlled room; these have now been moved to the Steven F. Udvar-Hazy Center.

The roof collapsed on the facility's Warehouse #21 just before dawn on February 10, 2010 during a blizzard and the region's second 15 to 30 inch snowstorm during a five-day period. The warehouse, scheduled for eventual demolition after transfer of the artifacts to the Steven F. Udvar-Hazy Center, contained historic aircraft and spacecraft that were exposed to sub-freezing temperatures and blowing snow. They were not thought to be damaged, as all were in protective boxes or crates on shelving units that were still supporting parts of the warehouse.

== See also ==
- Treloar Resource Centre
- Vimy House
