= Vimy House =

Warehouse used by the Canadian War Museum from 1983 to 2004

Coordinates: 45.409475°N 75.717312°W

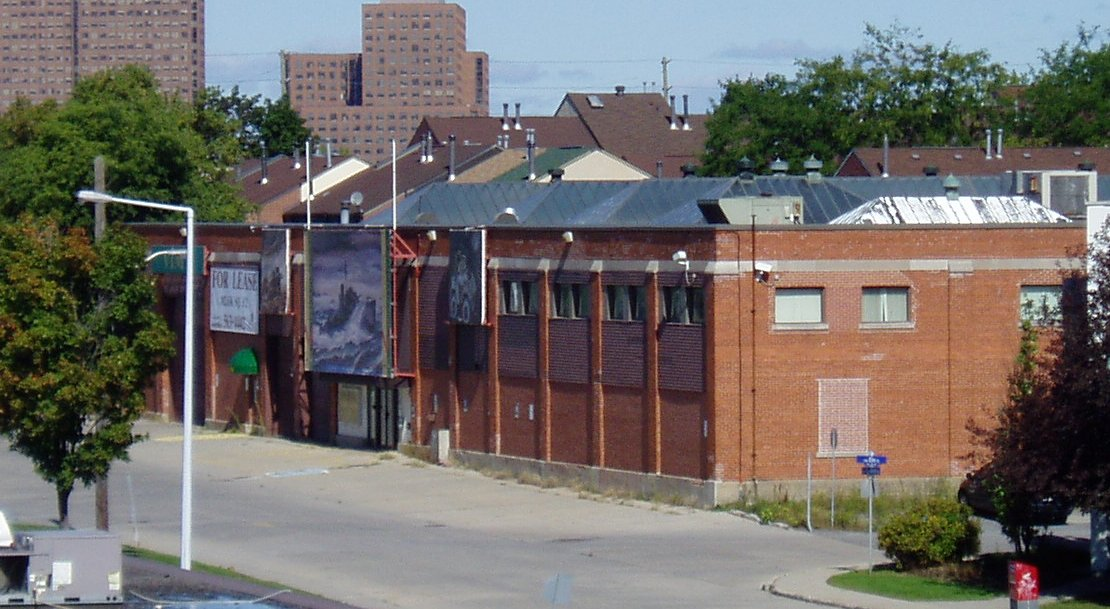
Vimy House in 2005

Vimy House was a warehouse in the Centretown West neighbourhood of Ottawa, Ontario, Canada that was used to store the collections of the Canadian War Museum from 1983 to 2004. The building, originally known as Champagne Garage was built to house the streetcars of the Ottawa Electric Railway. After the railway's closure in 1959, the Ottawa Transportation Commission (and later the Ottawa-Carleton Regional Transit Commission) used the warehouse for storing their buses up until 1979. The building was later acquired by the Canadian War Museum to be used as a storage facility for its collections when its Sussex Drive facility ran out of space. The building, later renamed Vimy House, became filled with a vast array of aged military paraphernalia including the world's largest collection of Canadian war art. While items from the Vimy House collection would occasionally be put on display at the museum itself, the public could also visit Vimy House on special open house days and tour its collection. The last open house was held on September 6, 2003.

In 2004, the collections at Vimy House were moved into the new Canadian War Museum building at LeBreton Flats. The building was sold and renovated and is now a self storage facility.

== See also ==
- Paul E. Garber Preservation, Restoration, and Storage Facility (United States)
- Treloar Resource Centre (Australia)
- Science and Innovation Park (United Kingdom)
