= Tsuruta =

Tsuruta or Tsuruda (鶴田 meaning "crane rice-field") may refer to:

- Tsuruta, Aomori, a town in Aomori Prefecture
- Tsuruda, Kagoshima, a former town in Kagoshima Prefecture
- 10744 Tsuruta, an asteroid

== People with the surname ==
- Gorō Tsuruta (鶴田 吾郎; 1890–1969), Japanese painter
- Jumbo Tsuruta (ジャンボ鶴田; 1951–2000), Japanese professional wrestler
- Kenji Tsuruta (鶴田 謙二; born 1961), Japanese manga artist
- Kinshi Tsuruta (鶴田 錦史; 1911–1995), Japanese musician
- Kōji Tsuruta (鶴田 浩二; 1924–1987), Japanese actor and singer
- Mayu Tsuruta (鶴田 真由; born 1970), Japanese actress
- Mei Tsuruta (鶴田 芽生; born 2006), Japanese rhythmic gymnast
- Michihiro Tsuruta (鶴田 道弘; born 1968), Japanese former football player
- Norio Tsuruta (鶴田 法男; born 1960), Japanese film director
- Remi Tsuruta (鶴田 玲美; born 1997), Japanese athlete
- Sachiko Tsuruta, Japanese-born American astrophysicist
- Tatsuya Tsuruta (鶴田 達也; born 1982), Japanese former football player
- Yoshiyuki Tsuruta (鶴田 義行; 1903–1986), Japanese swimmer and two-time Olympic champion
