= Japanese official war artists =

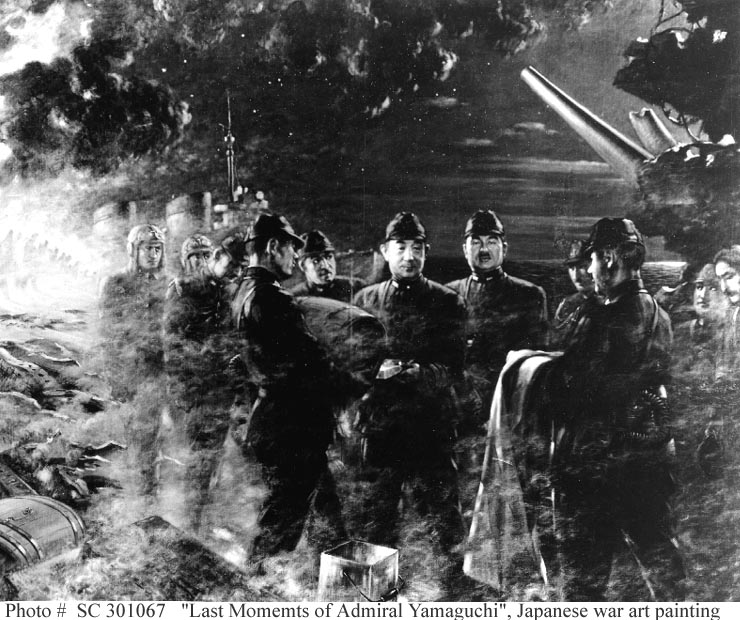
Last Moments of Admiral Yamaguchi by war artist Kita Renzo, 1942

Japanese official war artists were commissioned to create artwork in the context of a specific war. The artists were creating sensō sakusen kirokuga, 戦争作戦記録画 ("war campaign documentary painting") for the government of Japan.

Official war artists have been appointed by governments for information or propaganda purposes and to record events on the battlefield; but there are many other types of artists depicting the subject or events of war.

Between 1937 and 1945, Japan’s military leaders commissioned official war artists to create images of the Second Sino-Japanese War and the Pacific War. Approximately 200 pictures depicting Japan’s military campaigns were created. These pictures were presented at large-scale exhibitions during the war years.

== Second Sino-Japanese War ==
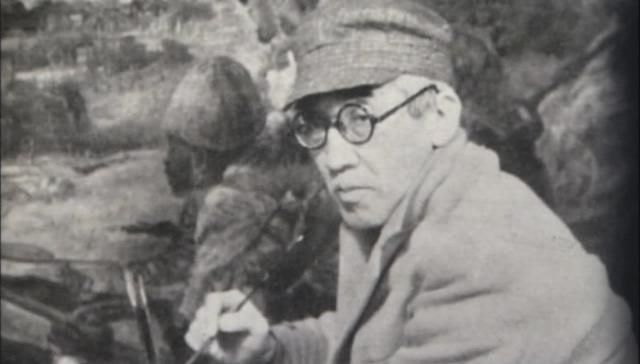
Foujita in the Army Art Association

The Japanese military supported artists during this conflict. For example, Tsuguharu Foujita was sent to China as an official war artist by the Imperial Japanese Naval Information office. In 1938, he traveled to the battlefield front in central China.

- Tsuguharu Foujita, 1886–1968.

== Pacific War ==
The Japanese government and military supported an extensive war art program involving hundreds of artists; however, little is known about it. In part, this is because the U.S. government confiscated the extant artwork. Many of the records have not been examined for scholarly review.

- Tsuguharu Foujita, 1886-1968.
- Tsuruta Gorō, 1890–1969.
- Ryushi Kawabata, 1855–1966.
- Ryohei Koiso, 1903–1988.
- Shin Kurihara, 1894–1966.
- Saburo Miyamoto, 1905–1974.
- Kenichi Nakamura, 1895–1967.
- Kita Renzo, 1876–1949.
- Konosuke Tamura, 1903–1986.
- Kenji Yoshioka, 1906–1990.

== See also ==
- War artists
- Military art
- War photography
