= Military art =

Works of art on military themes

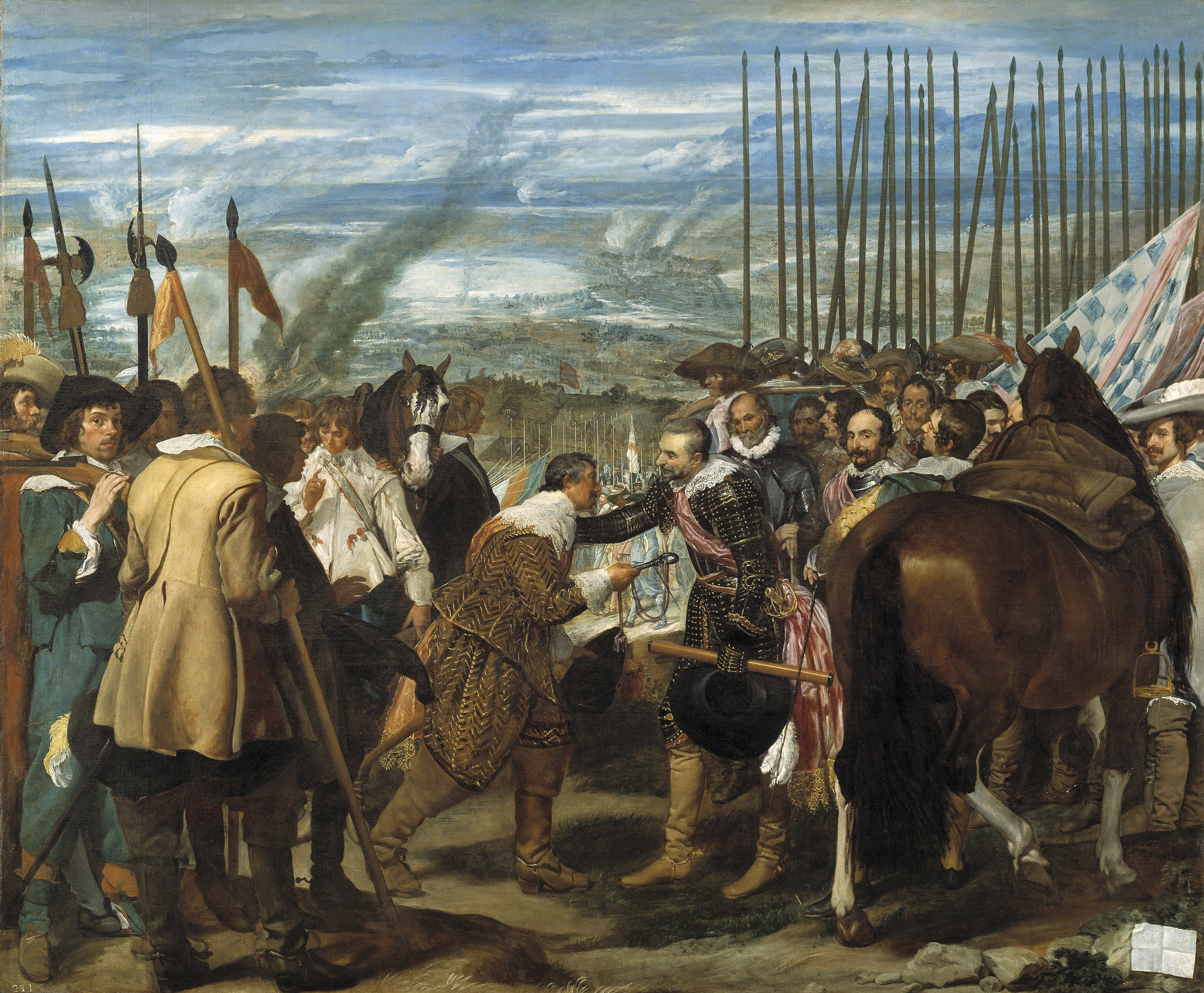
The Surrender of Breda by Diego Velázquez (1634–35) shows a crowded scene as the two sides meet peacefully to surrender the town.

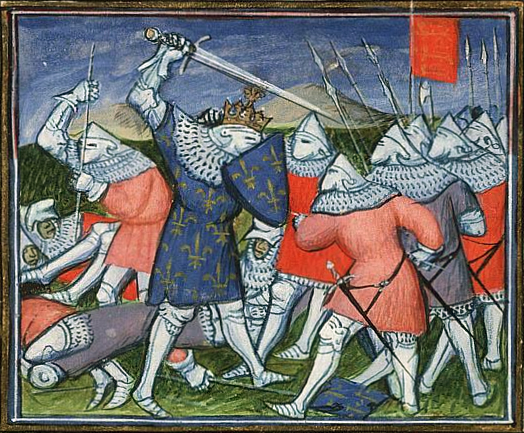
The Battle of Poitiers in 1356, in a manuscript of Froissart's Chronicles of c. 1410

Military art is art with a military subject matter, regardless of its style or medium. The battle scene is one of the oldest types of art in developed civilizations, as rulers would use to celebrate their victories and intimidate potential opponents. Depictions of the suffering from casualities and civilian involvments is a more recent development. As well as portraits of military figures, depictions of anonymous soldiers on the battlefield have been very common; since the introduction of military uniforms such works often concentrate on showing the variety of these.

Naval scenes are very common, and battle scenes and "ship portraits" are mostly considered as a branch of marine art; the development of other large types of military equipment such as warplanes and tanks has led to new types of work portraying these, either in action or at rest. In 20th century wars official war artists were retained to depict the military in action; despite artists now being very close to the action the battle scene is mostly left to popular graphic media and the cinema. The term war art is used, mostly in relation to 20th century military art made during wartime. A Veterans Art Institute website was launched in 2019, where service members and veterans can publish their work.

== History ==
=== Ancient world ===
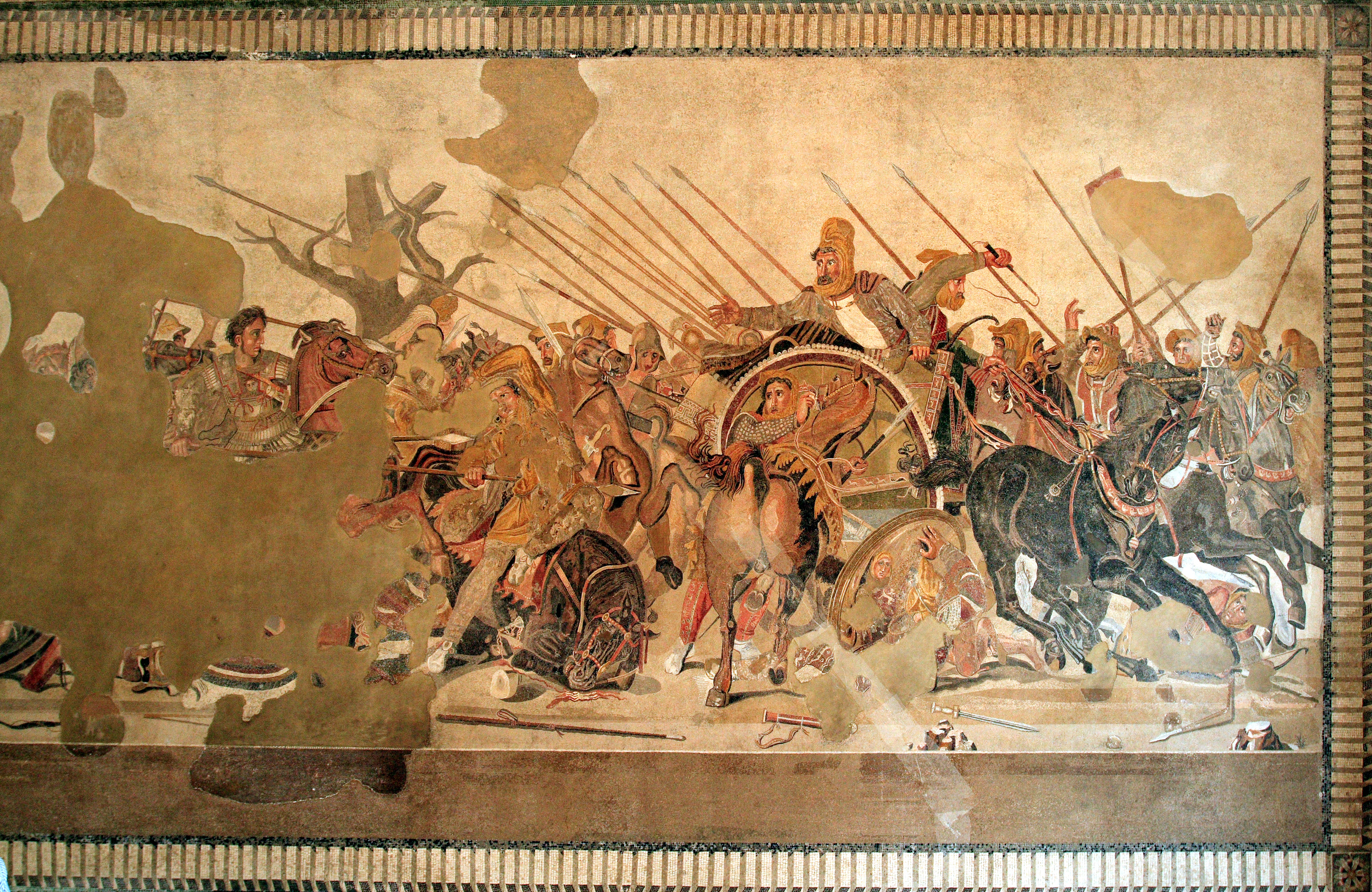
The Roman Alexander Mosaic showing Alexander the Great (left) defeating Darius III of Persia; a floor mosaic excavated from Pompeii, c. 100BC

Art depicting military themes has existed throughout history. The Battlefield Palette, a cosmetic palette from the Protodynastic Period of Egypt (circa ~3500 to 3000 BC) is incomplete, but shows prisoners being led away, and wild animals feasting on the dead. The Narmer Palette from the same period shows a military victory in a more symbolic style. The Stele of the Vultures, about 2,500 BC, is one of a number of Mesopotamian "victory stelae". Also around 2,500 BC, the earliest known depiction of a city being besieged is found in the tomb of Inti, an official from the 21st nome of Upper Egypt, who lived during the late Fifth Dynasty. The scene shows Egyptian soldiers scaling the walls of a near eastern fortress on ladders. Although the Battle of Kadesh in 1274 BC appears to have been inconclusive, reliefs erected by Ramesses II show him scattering his Hittite opponents with his chariot.

Surviving Assyrian art mainly consists of large stone reliefs showing detailed scenes of either military campaigns or hunting; the Lachish reliefs are an example of the former. The ancient Greek Parthenon Marbles show lengthy parades of the city's volunteer cavalry force, and many Greek vases show scenes of combat. In Han dynasty China, a famous stone relief of c. 150–170 AD from the Wu family shrines shows a battle between cavalry forces in the Campaign against Dong Zhuo.

In Ancient Roman art the most elaborate Roman triumphal columns showed very long reliefs of military campaigns winding round the body of huge columns; among the most impressive are those of Trajan and Marcus Aurelius in Rome. The Alexander Mosaic is a large and dramatic battle scene showing Alexander the Great defeating Darius III of Persia; it is a floor mosaic excavated from Pompeii, probably copying a lost painting. Many Hellenistic and Roman sarcophagi showed crowded scenes of combat, sometimes mythological (an amazonomachy is a term for a scene of battle between Amazons and Greeks), and usually not relating to a particular battle; these were not necessarily used to bury people with military experience. Such scenes had a great influence on Renaissance battle scenes. By the Late Roman Empire the reverse of coins very often showed soldiers and carried an inscription praising 'our boys', no doubt in hope of delaying the next military revolt.

=== Medieval ===
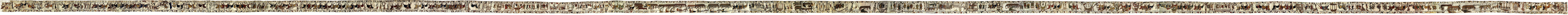
The entire 70-meter-long (230-foot) Bayeux Tapestry. Individual images of each scene are at Bayeux Tapestry tituli. (Swipe left or right.)

Christian art produced for the church generally avoided battle scenes, although a rare Late Antique motif shows Christ dressed as a victorious emperor in general's dress, having conquered the devil, in Christ treading on the beasts and other iconographies. The violent tastes of the Anglo-Saxon elite managed to add the Harrowing of Hell, conceived as a raid on Satan's stronghold, led by Christ, to the standard group of scenes for a cycle on the Life of Christ. Soldier saints, shown in military dress, were extremely popular, as were images of the Archangel Michael stabbing Satan as a dragon with a cross with a spear-point at its base. Some illuminated manuscripts illustrated the many battles in the Old Testament.

Secular works produced for secular patrons often show military themes, for example in illuminated manuscript copies of histories like the 15th century Froissart of Louis of Gruuthuse (BnF Fr 2643-6), where most of the 112 miniatures show military scenes. The Siege of the Castle of Love, often found on Gothic ivory mirror-cases, showed knights attacking a castle defended by ladies, a metaphor from the literature of courtly love. The 11th century Bayeux Tapestry is a linear panoramic narrative of the events surrounding the Norman Conquest and the Battle of Hastings in 1066, the only surviving example of a type of embroidered hanging with which rich Anglo-Saxons used to decorate their homes. In Islamic art the battle scene, often from a fictional work of epic poetry, was a frequent subject in Persian miniatures, and the high viewpoint they adopted made the scenes more easily comprehensible than many Western images.

=== Renaissance to Napoleonic Wars ===
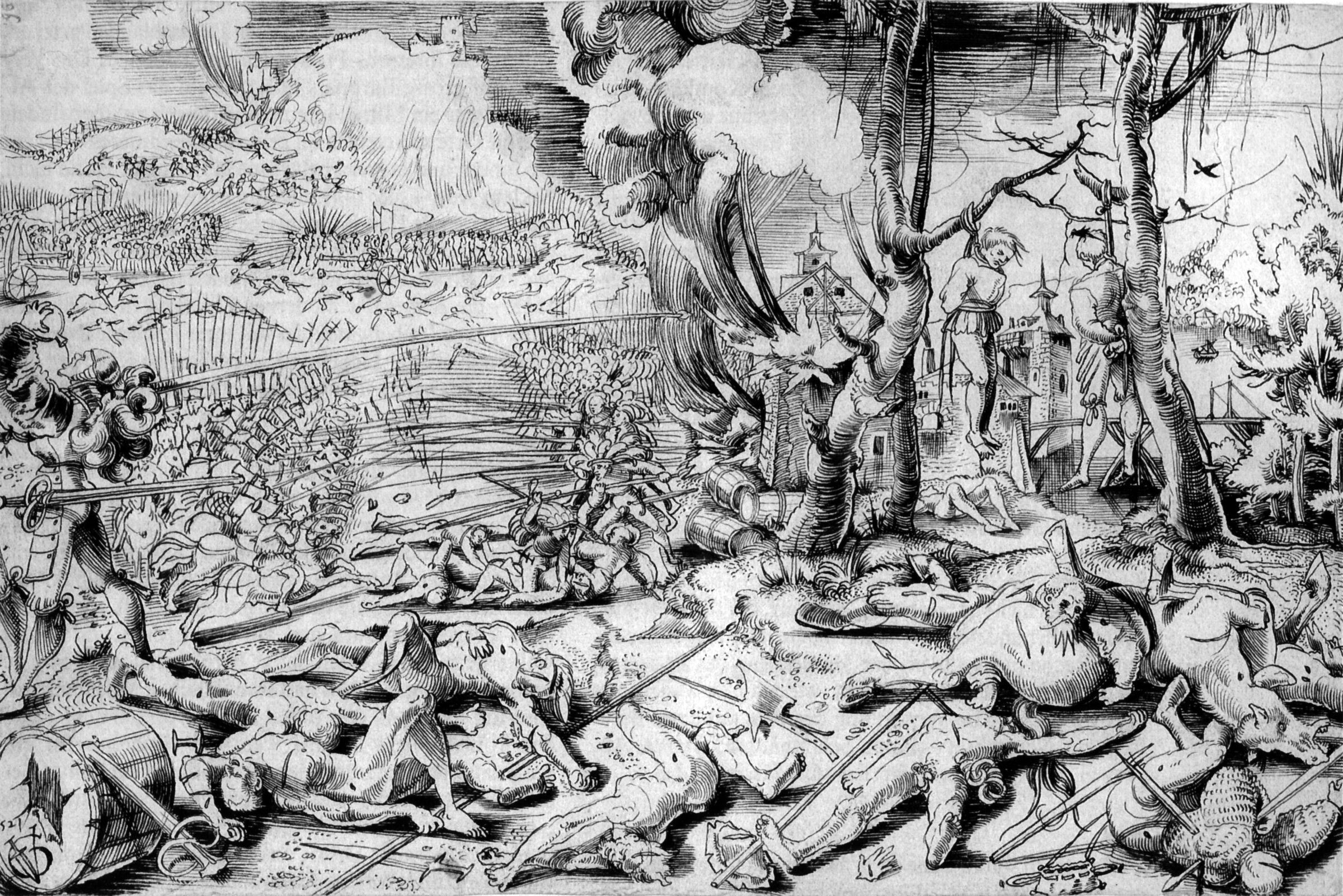
After the Battle of Marignano, a 1521 drawing by Urs Graf

Italian Renaissance painting saw a great increase in military art by the leading artists, battle paintings often featuring near-contemporary scenes such as the huge set of three canvases of The Battle of San Romano (c. 1445) by Paolo Uccello, and the abortive Battle of Cascina (1504–1506) by Michelangelo and Battle of Anghiari by Leonardo da Vinci (1503–1506), which were intended to be placed opposite each other in the Palazzo Vecchio in Florence, but neither of which were completed. For Renaissance artists with their new skills in depicting the human figure, battle scenes allowed them to demonstrate all their skills in depicting complicated poses; Michelangelo choose a moment when a group of soldiers was surprised bathing, and almost all the figures are nude. Leonardo's battle was a cavalry one, the central section of which was very widely seen before being destroyed, and hugely influential: it "exerted a fundamental change on the whole idea of battle painting, an influence that lasted through the Late Renaissance and the Baroque up until the heroic machines of the Napoleonic painters and even the battle compositions of Delacroix", according to the art historian Frederick Hartt.

All of these depicted frankly minor actions where Florence had defeated neighbouring cities, but important battles from distant history were equally popular. Andrea Mantegna's Triumphs of Caesar shows the Roman triumphal parade of Julius Caesar, though concentrating on the booty rather than the army following it; the print series Triumphs of Maximilian shows both, leading up to Maximilian II, Holy Roman Emperor riding on a huge carriage. The Battle of the Milvian Bridge by Giulio Romano brought a huge and "seminal" battle scene into the Raphael Rooms in the Vatican Palace. The unusual The Battle of Alexander at Issus (1528–29) by Albrecht Altdorfer managed to make one of the most highly regarded Renaissance battle scenes, despite, or perhaps because of, having a vertical format, which was dictated by the planned setting; it was commissioned as one of a set of eight battle paintings by various artists. "It was the most detailed and panoramic battle picture of its day", and its aerial viewpoint was to be very widely followed over the next centuries, though rarely to such dramatic effect.

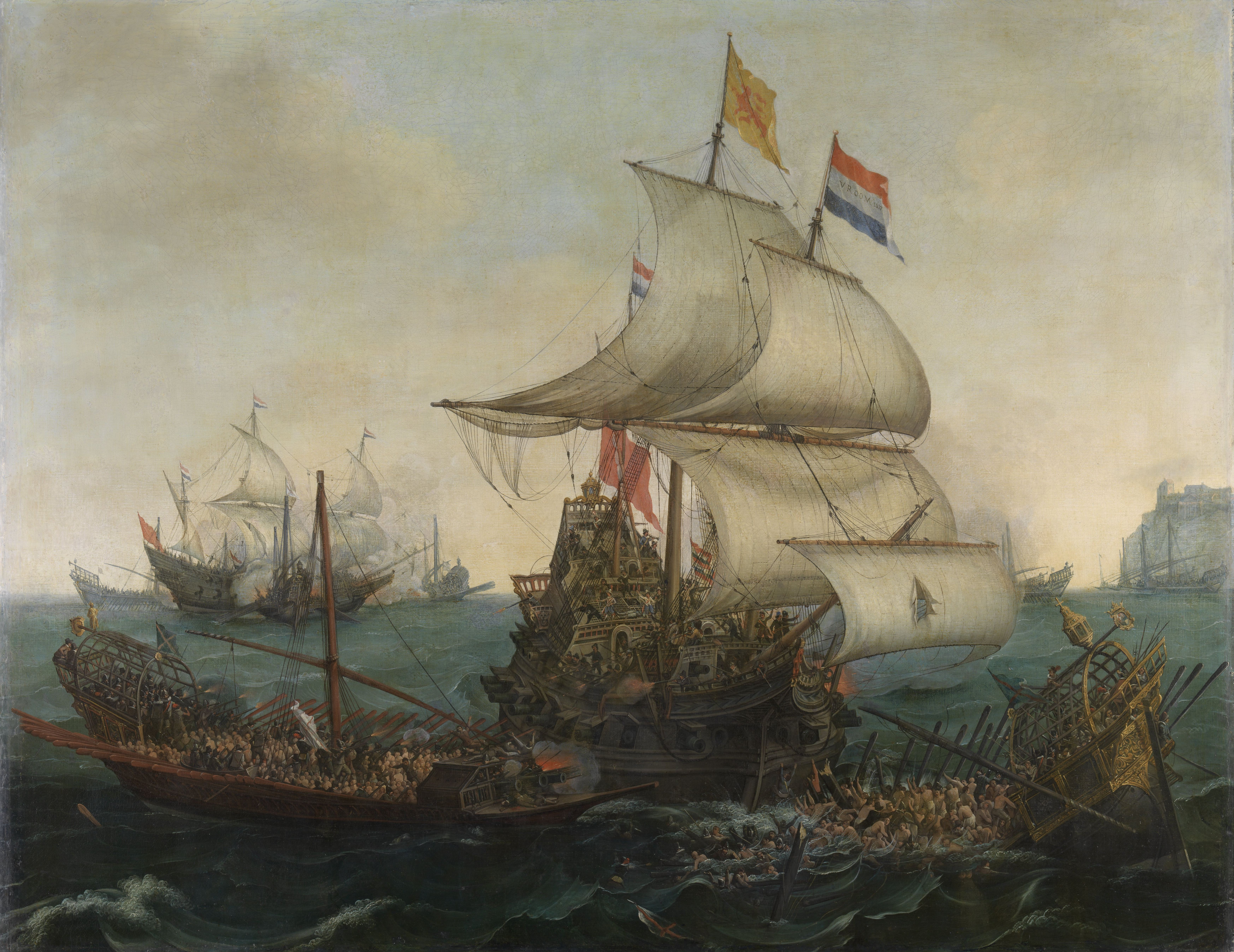
Dutch Ships Ramming Spanish Galleys off the Flemish Coast in October 1602, 1617, by Hendrick Vroom

Especially in Northern Europe, small groups of soldiers became a popular subject for paintings and especially prints by many artists, including Urs Graf, who is unusual in that he was a professional Swiss mercenary for many years. These works began to present a less heroic view of soldiers, who often represented a considerable threat to civilian populations even in peacetime, though the extravagant costumes of the Landsknecht are often treated as glamorous. For Peter Paret, from the Renaissance "the glorification of the temporal leader and of his political system – which had of course also been present in medieval art – replaces the Christian faith as a determining interpretive force" in military art.

Naval painting became conventionalized in 17th century Dutch Golden Age painting, and from then on artists tended to specialize in it or not attempt it; apart from anything else "Marine artists have always dealt with a particularly demanding class of patron", as J. M. W. Turner found when the "Sailor King" William IV of the United Kingdom rejected his version of The Battle of Trafalgar because of inaccuracy. Hendrick Vroom was the earliest real specialist, followed by the father and son team of Willem van de Velde, who emigrated to London in 1673, and effectively founded the English tradition of naval painting, "producing a stunning visual record of the Anglo-Dutch naval wars, which set the conventions of maritime battle painting for the next 150 years". Vroom had also worked for English patrons, designing a large set of tapestries of the defeat of the Spanish Armada which was destroyed when the Houses of Parliament burnt down in 1834.

The 17th and 18th centuries saw depictions of battles mostly adopting a bird's eye view, as though from a hill nearby; this made them less interesting to paint, and the major artists now tended to avoid them. A very different view of warfare is seen in Les Grandes Misères de la guerre ("The Misfortunes of War"), a set of twelve etchings produced by Jacques Callot during the Thirty Years War which follows a group of soldiers ravaging the countryside before eventually being rounded up by their own side and executed. Also in the first half of the 17th century, a branch of genre painting in Dutch Golden Age painting specialized in guardroom scenes of rather disorderly soldiers, not often in battle, but ransacking farmhouses or sitting around in a camp guardroom. The paintings of Salvator Rosa, essentially landscapes, often showed groups variously described as bandits or soldiers lurking in the countryside of Southern Italy. The Surrender of Breda by Velázquez (1634–35) shows a crowded scene as the two sides meet peacefully to surrender the town; a theme more often copied in naval painting than land-based military art.

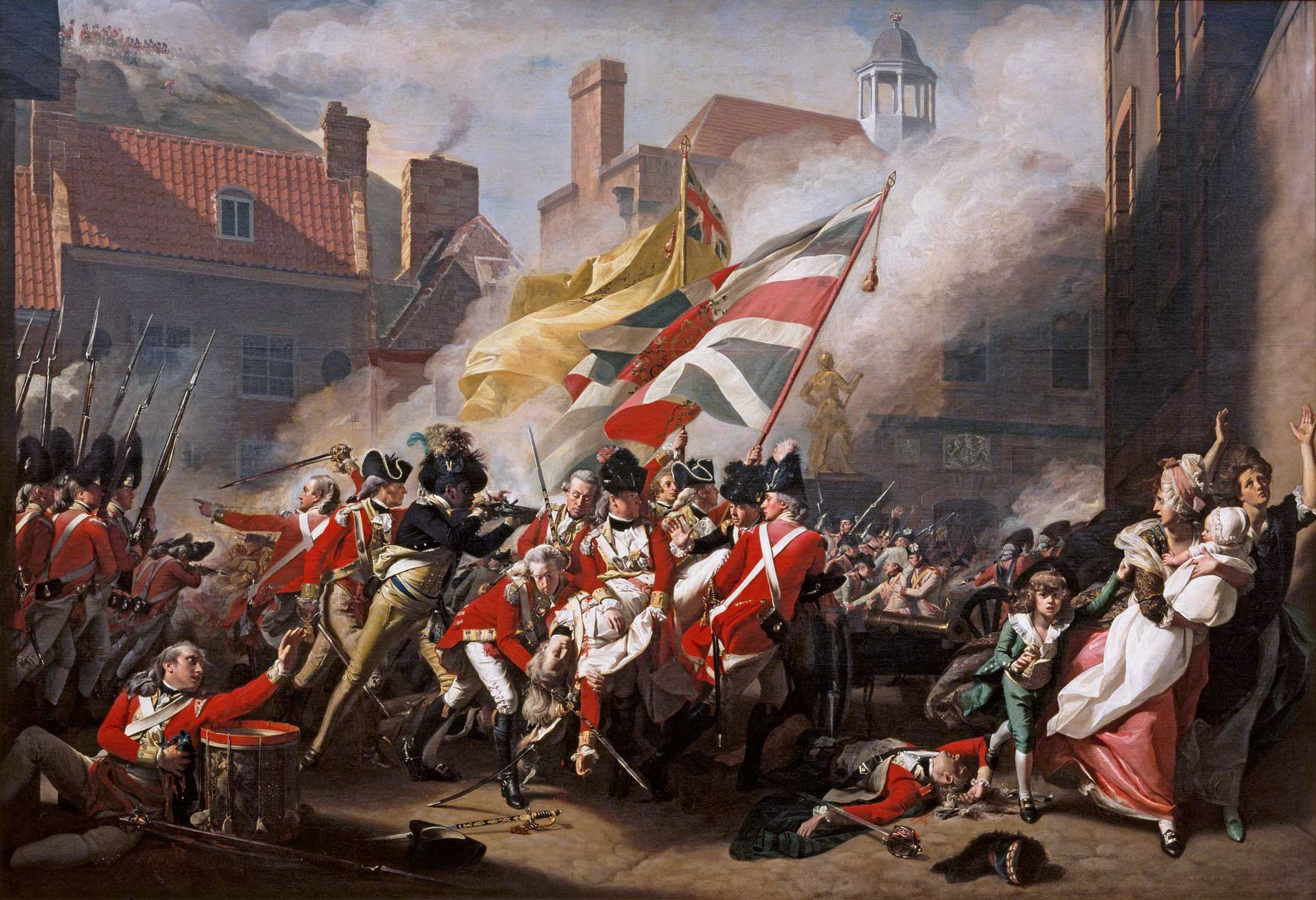
The Death of Major Peirson, 6 January 1781, 1784, by John Singleton Copley

From at least the late 15th century, sets of tapestries became the grandest medium for "official military art"; the Portuguese Pastrana Tapestries (1470s) were an early example. A set produced for the Duke of Marlborough showing his victories was varied for different clients, and even sold to one of his opponents, Maximilian II Emanuel, Elector of Bavaria, after reworking the general's faces and other details.

In the mid-18th century, a number of artists, especially in Britain, sought to revive military art with large works centered on a heroic incident that would once again bring the genre to the fore in history painting, as it had been in the Renaissance. The standard contemporary battle scene tended to be grouped in the lowly category of topographical painting, covering maps and views of country houses. The Death of General Wolfe (1771) by Benjamin West, The Death of Captain James Cook (1779) by Johann Zoffany, The Defeat of the Floating Batteries at Gibraltar, September 1782 and The Death of Major Pierson (1784) by John Singleton Copley are leading examples of the new type, which ignored complaints about the unsuitability of modern dress for heroic subjects. However, such works had more immediate influence in France than in Britain.

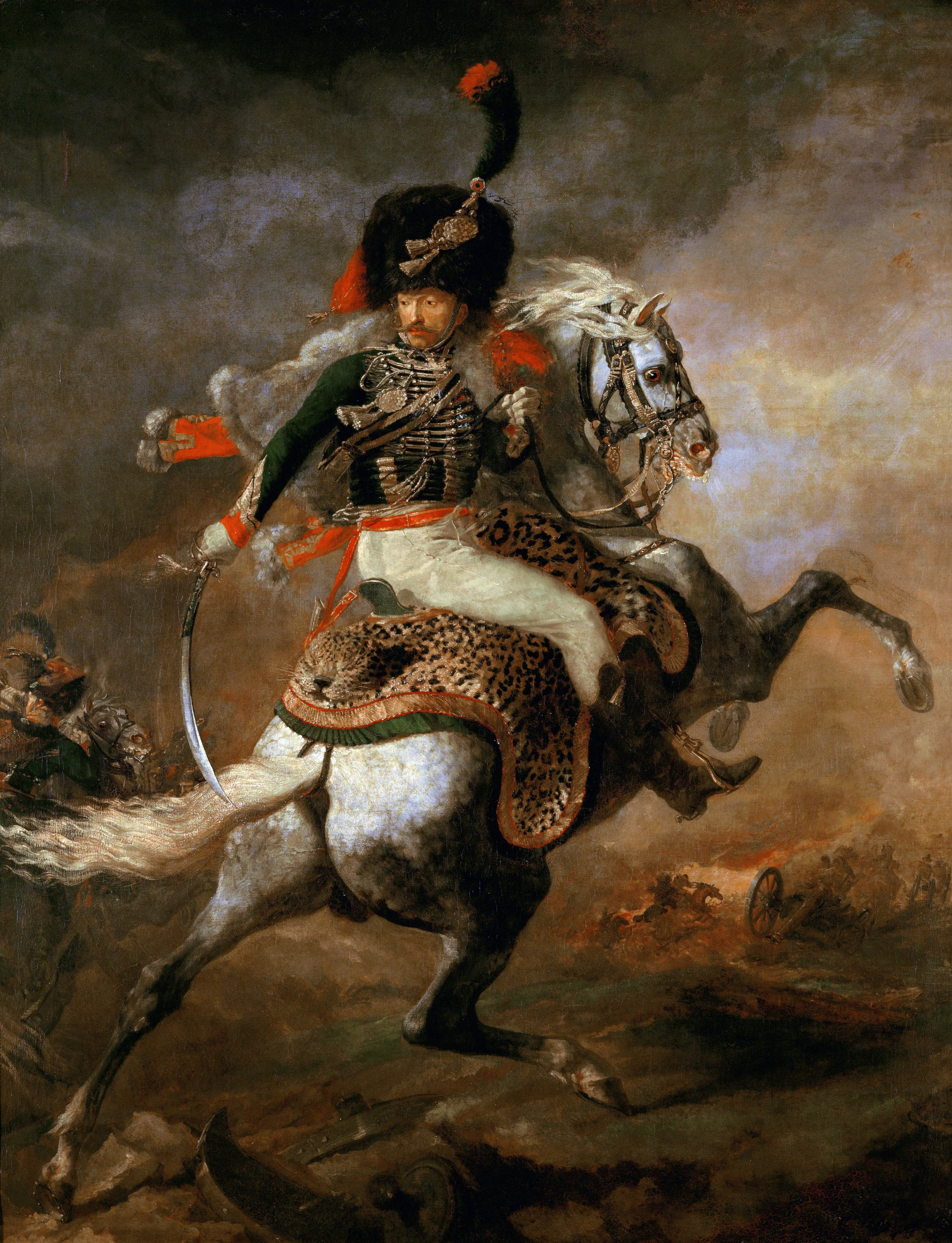
The Charging Chasseur, 1812 by Théodore Géricault

In the Napoleonic era, France added Romanticism to its style and began to portray individual soldiers with more character. Battle paintings were increasingly produced for large public buildings, and grew larger than ever before. Baron Gros painted mostly glorifications of Napoleon and his victories, but his 1808 painting of the Battle of Eylau does not neglect the suffering of the dead and wounded on the frozen battlefield. In contrast, Goya's large paintings The Second of May 1808 and The Third of May 1808, perhaps consciously conceived as a riposte to Gros, and his related series of 82 etchings, The Disasters of War (Spanish: Los Desastres de la Guerra), emphasized the brutality of the French forces during the Peninsular War in Spain. British depictions of the Napoleonic Wars continued the late 18th century patterns, often on a larger scale, with the death of Admiral Horatio Nelson quickly producing large works by Arthur William Devis (The Death of Nelson, 21 October 1805) and West (The Death of Nelson). J. M. W. Turner was among the artists who produced scenes of Nelson's victories, with The Battle of Trafalgar. The British Institution ran competitions for sketches of art commemorating British victories, the winning entries being then commissioned.

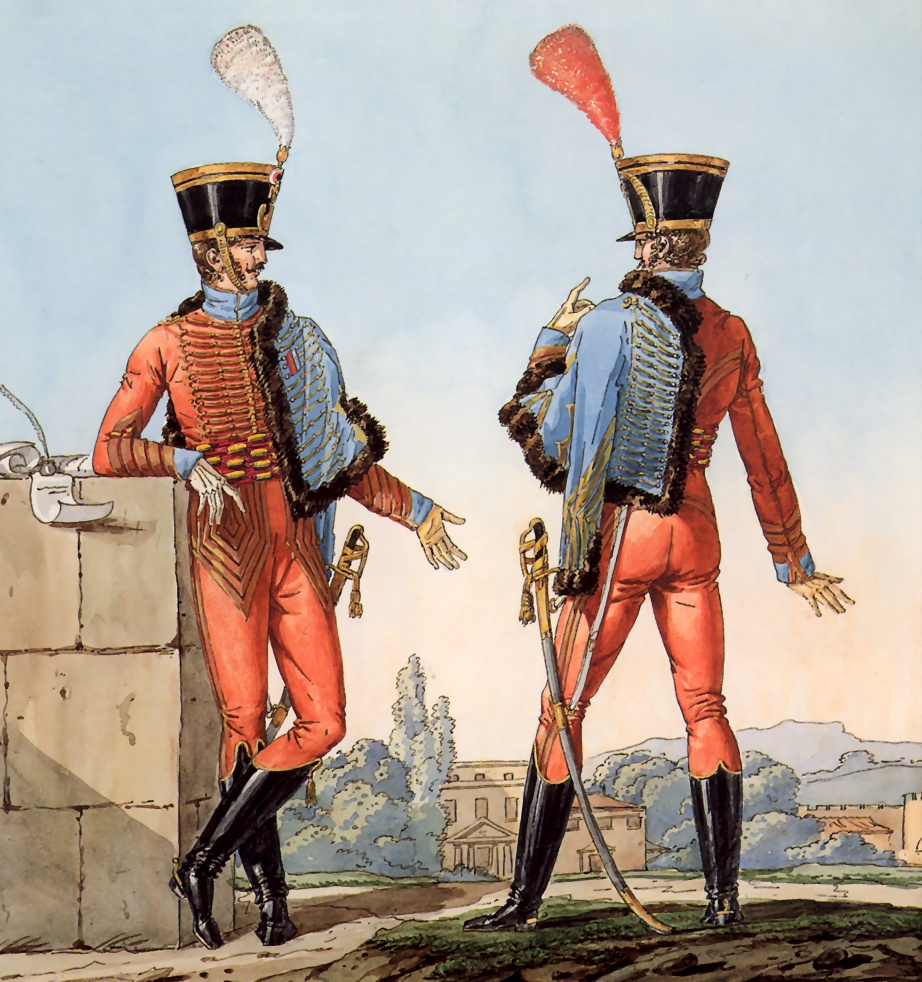
10th Regiment of Hussars, by Carle Vernet

In this period the uniform print, concentrating on a detailed depiction of the uniform of one or more standing figures, typically hand-coloured, also became very popular across Europe. Like other prints these were typically published in book form, but also sold individually. In Britain the 87 prints of The Loyal Volunteers of London (1797–98) by Thomas Rowlandson, published by Rudolph Ackermann, mark the start of the classic period. Though Rowlandson usually satirized his subjects to some degree, here the soldiers were "represented as they, and particularly their colonels who paid for their uniforms, preferred to see themselves", which remained the usual depiction in such prints. A set of prints by Carle Vernet of the splendid uniforms of La Grande Armée de 1812 showed most foot-soldiers in pairs in camp, in a variety of relaxed poses that showed one from the front and the other from behind. A rare oil painting by a leading artist that treats soldiers in the spirit of the uniform print is Soldiers of the 10th Light Dragoons (the "Prince of Wales Own") painted in 1793 by George Stubbs for their Colonel in Chief, the future George IV of the United Kingdom. Other paintings of single soldiers were more dramatic, like Théodore Géricault's The Charging Chasseur (c. 1812).

=== Nineteenth century ===
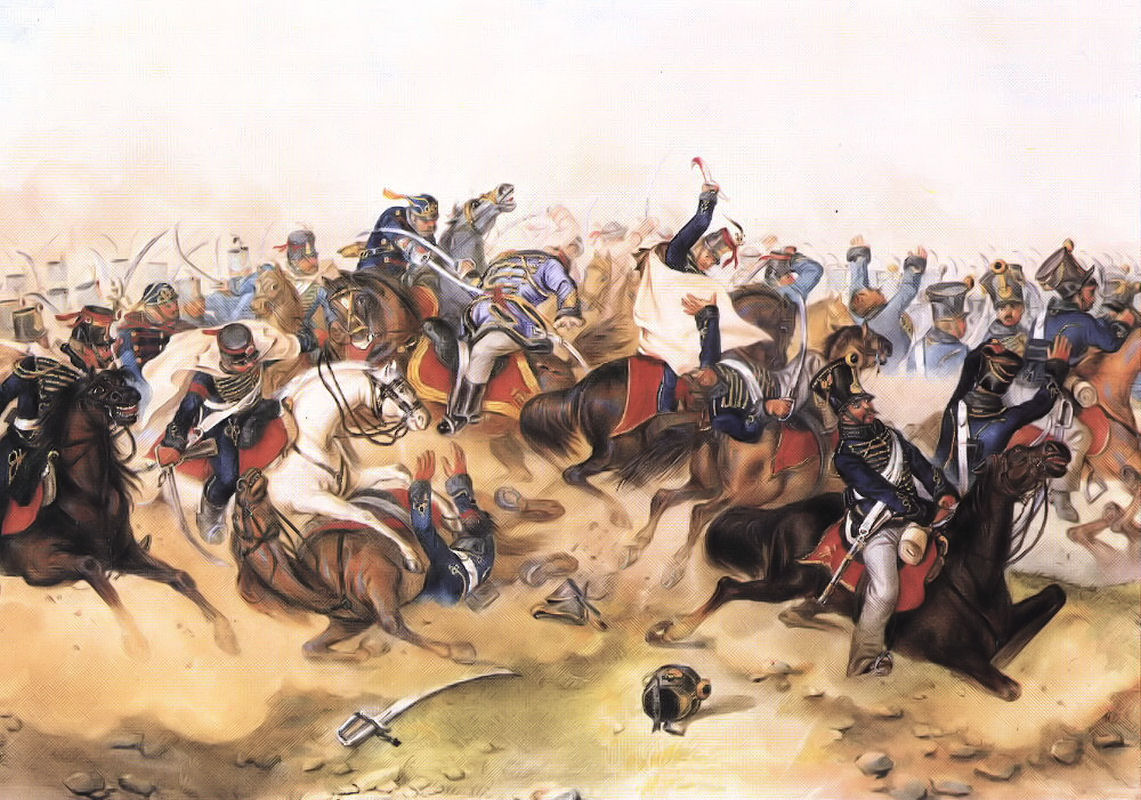
Battle scene at Tápióbicske by Mór Than, 1849

Eugène Delacroix, who also painted many smaller combat scenes, finished his The Massacre at Chios in 1824, showing a then notorious attack on Greek civilians by Ottoman forces during the Greek War of Independence. It had a more immediate impact on European art than Goya's Tres de Mayo (The Third of May 1808) of a few years earlier, which not on display in the Prado Museum until years later. In contrast, Delacroix's Liberty Leading the People of 1830 showed fighting in a positive light, but not the "military" as it shows armed civilian revolutionaries of the July Revolution, advancing against the unseen uniformed forces of the government. Turkish war atrocities were to remain a recurrent theme in 19th-century painting, especially in former Ottoman territories escaped from the declining empire (often pre-rape scenes treated rather salaciously), and general anti-military sentiments, previously mostly found in prints, were emerged regularly in large oil paintings.

Military art remained popular during the remainder of the 19th century in most of Europe. French artists such as Ernest Meissonier, Edouard Detaille, and Alphonse de Neuville established military genre painting in the Paris Salon. New forms of military art which developed in the 1850s met considerable opposition from the Royal Academy in the United Kingdom.

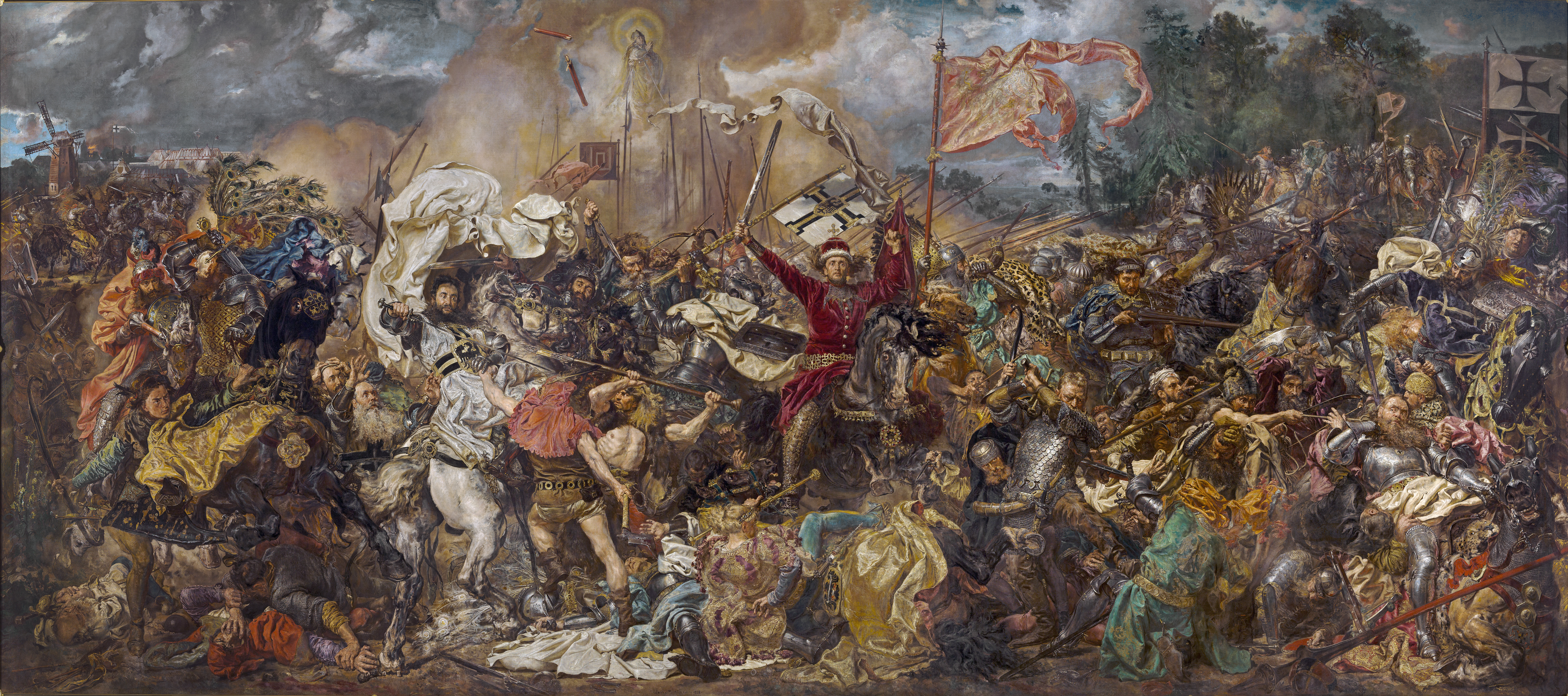
Battle of Grunwald by Jan Matejko, 1878

European artists in a generally academic style who were well known as painters of battle scenes, still often of subjects from the Napoleonic Wars or older conflicts, included Albrecht Adam, Nicaise de Keyser, Piotr Michałowski Antoine Charles Horace Vernet, Emile Jean Horace Vernet, Wilhelm Camphausen and Emil Hünten. The rise of nationalism promoted battle painting in countries such as Hungary (great attention paid to uniforms), Poland (huge forces) and the Czech Lands. Jan Matejko's enormous Battle of Grunwald (1878) reflects Pan-Slav sentiment, showing various Slav forces joining to smash the power of the Teutonic Knights.

The usage of the term "military art" has evolved since the middle of the 19th century. In France, Charles Baudelaire discussed military art, and the impact on it of photography, in the Paris Salon of 1859. A British critic of the Royal Academy exhibition of 1861 observed that

British painters have never fully grappled with military art, they have only hovered around the edges, touching and trimming. – William Michael Rossetti

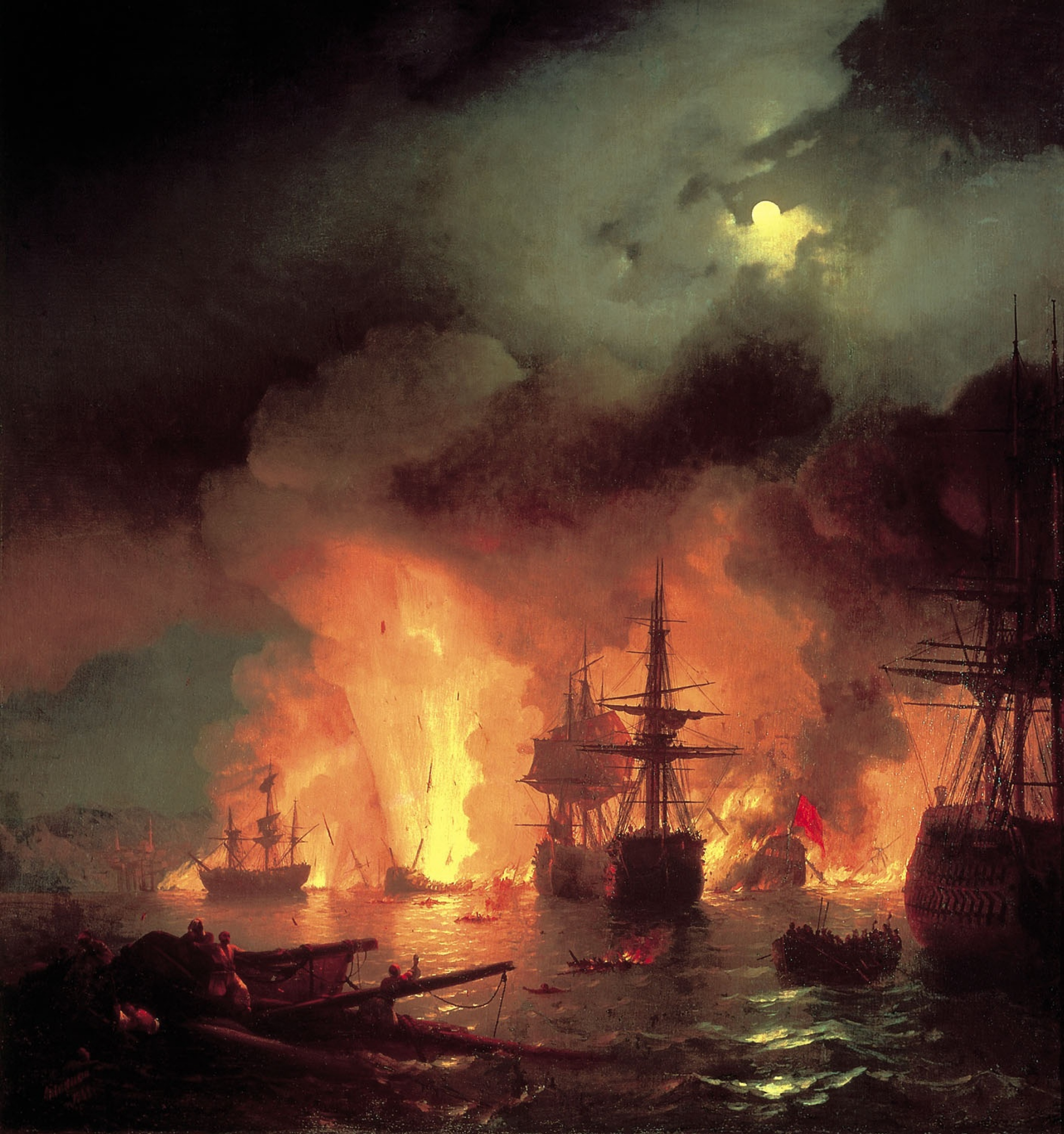
Battle of Chesma by Ivan Aivazovsky, 1848

In contrast, the British artist Elizabeth Thompson (Lady Butler) explained that she "never painted for the glory of war, but to portray its pathos and heroism." The aftermath of battle was depicted in paintings like Calling the Roll After An Engagement, Crimea, which displayed at the Royal Academy in 1874. This perspective is also seen in Remnants of an Army which showed William Brydon struggling into Jalalabad on a dying horse. Dr. Brydon was the sole survivor of the 1842 retreat from Kabul, in which 16,000 were massacred by Afghan tribesmen.

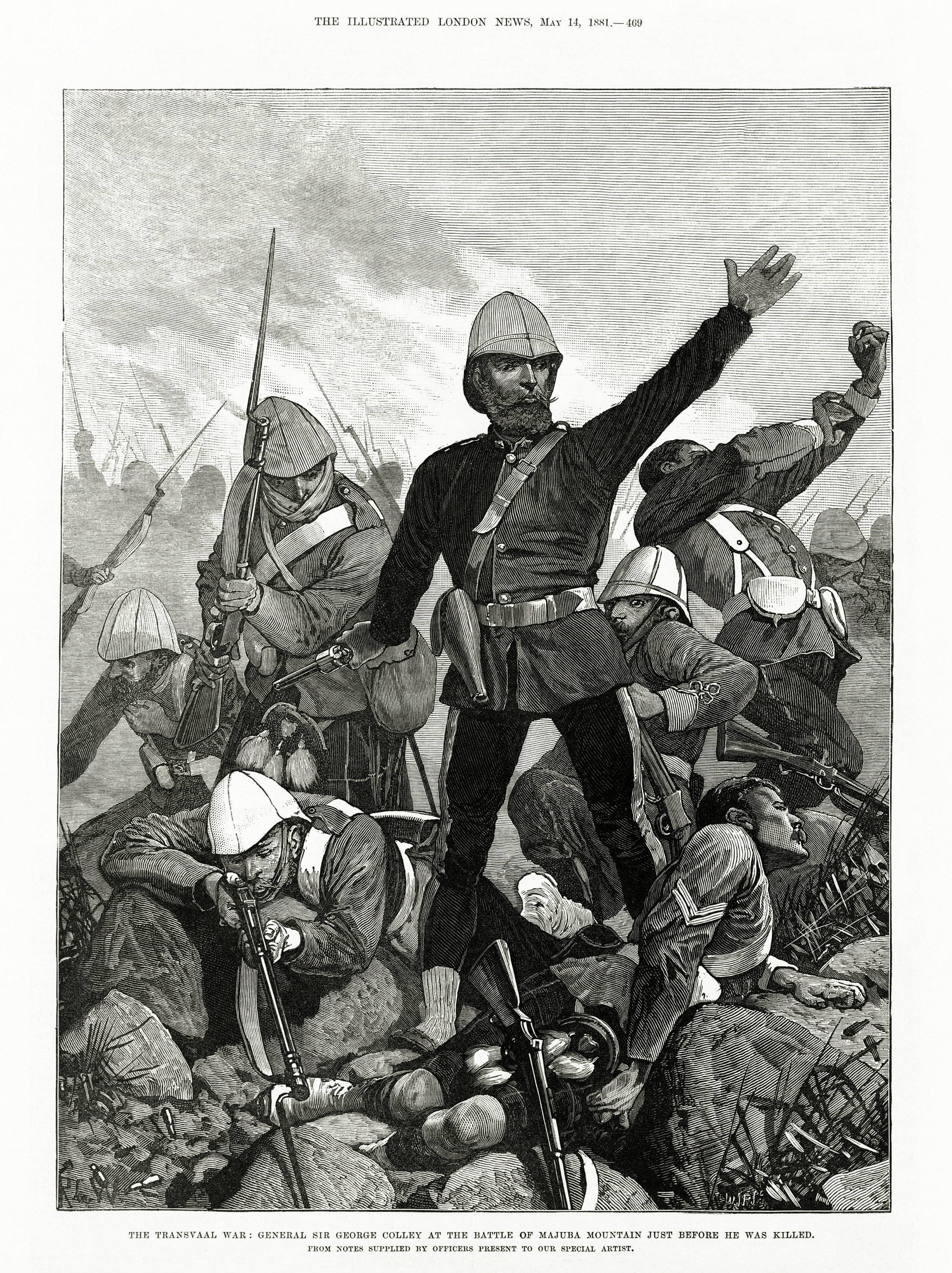
Engraving after Melton Prior of the Battle of Majuba Hill, for the Illustrated London News, 1881

The British market began to develop in the middle of the 19th century. The relations between the state and its military, and the ideologies which are implied in that relationship affected the artwork, the artists and the public perceptions of both artwork and artists.

By the time of the American Civil War and the Crimean War photographers began to compete strongly with artists in coverage of scenes in camp, and the aftermath of battle, but exposure times were generally too long to enable them to take pictures of battles very effectively. War photography is not covered in this article. Illustrations for newspapers and magazines continued a heroic style with perhaps more confidence than painters, and Melton Prior followed British forces around Imperial troublespots for decades, working for the Illustrated London News; his scenes "helped to establish a style of action draughtsmanship which has left an indelible stamp on the art of the comic strip." Prior and other "special correspondents" such as Frederic Villiers were known as "specials". Richard Caton Woodville Jr. and Charles Edwin Fripp were "specials" and also painters who exhibited at the Royal Academy and elsewhere.

=== Twentieth century ===
Stormtroopers Advancing Under Gas, etching and aquatint by Otto Dix from Der Krieg, 1924

World War I confirmed the end of the glorification of war in art, which had been in decline since the end of the previous century. Despite the establishment of large schemes employing official war artists, the most striking art depicting the war is emphasizing its horror. Official war artists were appointed by governments for information or propaganda purposes and to record events on the battlefield; but many artists fought as normal soldiers and recorded their experiences at the time and later, including the Germans George Grosz and Otto Dix, who had both fought on the Western Front, and continued to depict the subject for the rest of their careers. Dix's The Trench (1923), showing the dismembered bodies of the dead after an assault, caused a scandal, and was first displayed behind a curtain, before causing the dismissal of the museum director who had planned to buy it. Later, after exhibiting it in their 1937 travelling exhibition of "Degenerate art", the Nazi government burnt it. He produced a set of fifty prints in 1924 on Der Krieg ("The War"). The English artist Paul Nash began to make drawings of the war while fighting on the Western Front in the Artists Rifles. After recovering from a wound he was recruited as an official war artist and produced many of the most memorable images from the British side of both World Wars. After the war, the huge demand for war memorials caused a boom for sculptors, covered below, and makers of stained-glass.

Posters had become universal by 1914 and were addressed at both the military and the "home front" for various purposes, including recruitment, where the British Lord Kitchener Wants You (not actually the slogan) was repeated in the United States with Uncle Sam, and elsewhere with similar totemic figures. The Soviet Union began with very Modernist posters such as Beat the Whites with the Red Wedge by Lazar Markovich Lissitzky but soon turned to socialist realism, used for most World War II posters from the Soviet Union, which sometimes are similar to their Nazi equivalents. In World War II they were even more widely used. Illustrators and sketch artists such as Norman Rockwell also followed the trend away from military themed shots following the Second World War and with the rise of photographic covers in general.

The impact of the Spanish Civil War on a non-combatant populace was depicted in Picasso's 1937 masterpiece, Guernica, showing the 1937 bombing of Guernica; a very different treatment of a similar subject is seen in Henry Moore's drawings of sleeping civilians sheltering from The Blitz bombing on the station platforms of the London Underground. Among official World War II war artists, Paul Nash's Totes Meer is a powerful image of a scrapyard of shot-down German aircraft, and the landscapist Eric Ravilious produced some very fine paintings before being shot down and killed in 1942. Edward Ardizzone's pictures concentrated entirely on soldiers relaxing or performing routine duties, and were praised by many soldiers: "He is the only person who has caught the atmosphere of this war" felt Douglas Cooper, the art critic and historian, friend of Picasso, and then in a military medical unit. Photography and film were now able to capture fast-moving action, and can fairly be said to have produced most of memorable images recording combat in the war, and certainly subsequent conflicts like the Vietnam War, which was more notable for specifically anti-war protest art, in posters and the work of artists like Nancy Spero. Contemporary military art is part of the subfield "military and popular culture".

== Art forms ==
=== Portraiture ===
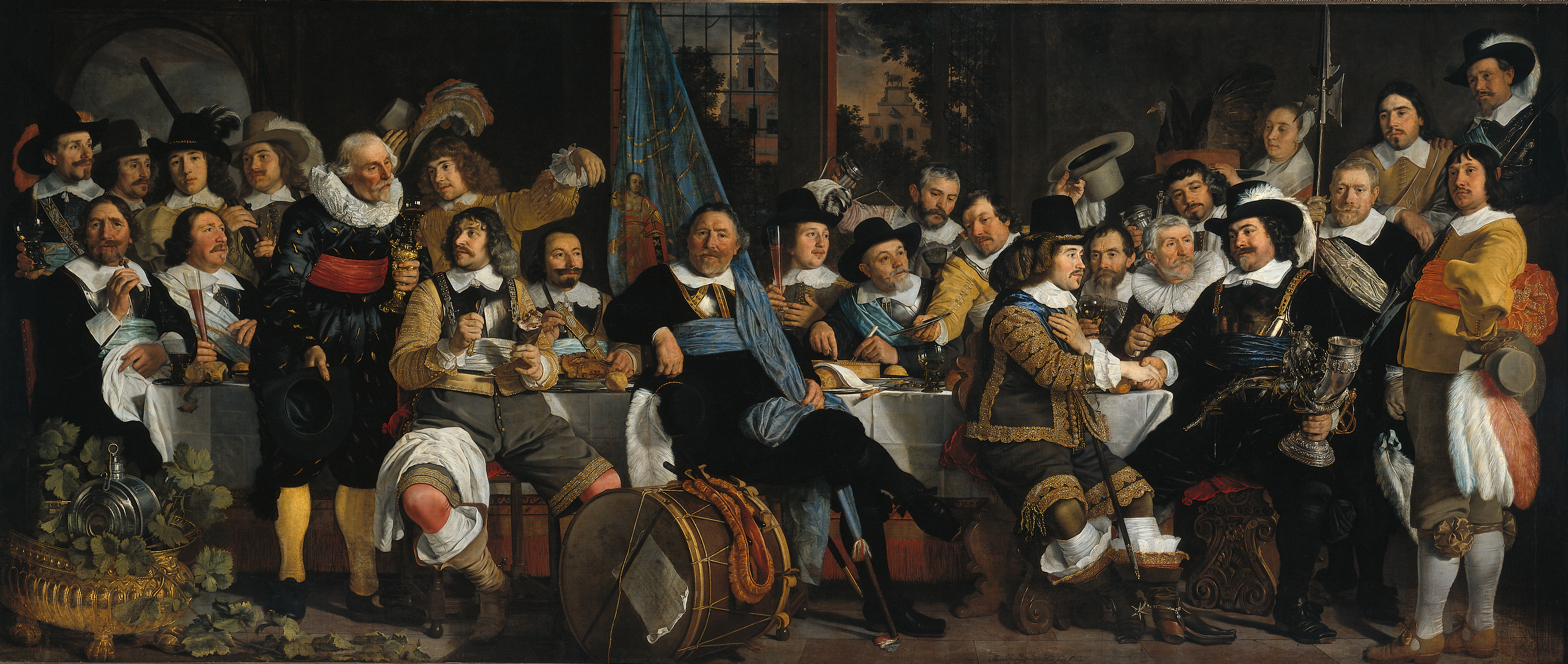
Banquet of the Amsterdam Civic Guard in Celebration of the Peace of Münster, 1648, by Bartholomeus van der Helst, 232 cm × 547 cm (91 in × 215 in)

Rulers have been shown in specifically military dress since ancient times; the difference is especially easy to see in Ancient Roman sculpture, where generals and increasingly often emperors are depicted with armour and the short military tunic. Medieval tomb effigies more often than not depict knights, nobles and kings in armour, whether or not they saw active service. In the Early Modern period, when senior commanders tended to wear their normal riding dress even on the battlefield, the distinction between a military portrait and a normal one is mostly conveyed by the background, or by a breastplate or the buff leather jerkin worn underneath armour, but once even generals began to wear military uniform, in the mid-18th century, it becomes clear again, although initially officer's uniforms were close to smart civilian costume.

Full-length and equestrian portraits of rulers and generals often showed them on the battlefield, but with the action in the distant background; a feature probably dating back to Titian's magisterial Equestrian Portrait of Charles V, which shows the emperor after his victory at the Battle of Mühlberg but with no other soldiers present. Monarchs were not often painted in military uniform until the Napoleonic period, but in the 19th century this became typical for formal portraits, perhaps because uniform was more visually appealing. A distinctively Dutch type of painting are huge group portraits commissioned by the wealthy part-time officers of city militia companies, of which Rembrandt's Night Watch (1642) is the most famous, although its narrative setting is atypical of the genre. Most examples just show the officers lined up as though about to eat dinner, and some show them actually eating it. Otherwise group portraits of officers are rather surprisingly rare until the 19th century.

=== Sculpture ===
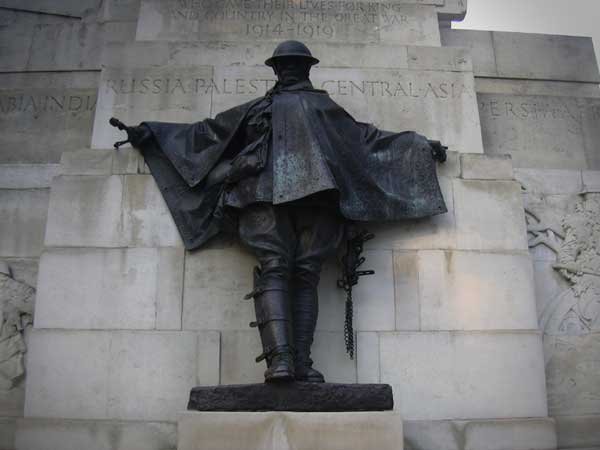
One of the figures on the Royal Artillery Memorial in London, by Charles Sargeant Jagger

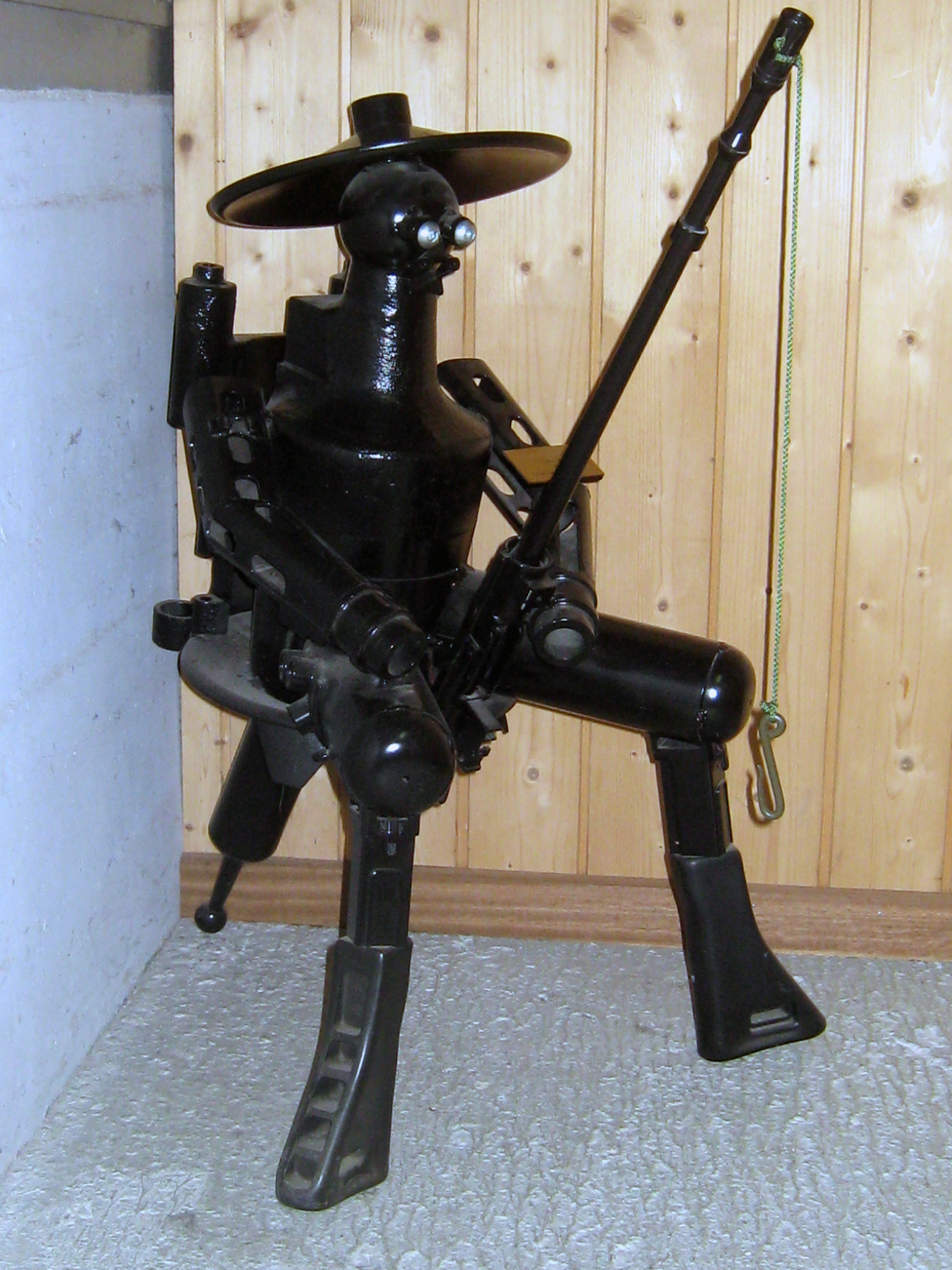
Sculpture made from Swiss assault rifles Stgw 57

Most surviving sculpture of battle scenes from antiquity is in stone reliefs, covered above. Renaissance artists and patrons were keen to revive this form, which they mostly did in much smaller scenes in stone or bronze. The tomb in Milan of the brilliant French general Gaston of Foix, Duke of Nemours included numerous marble reliefs round the base of the sarcophagus (which was never completed). Statues and tomb monuments of commanders continued to be the most common site until the more general war memorial commemorating all the dead began to emerge in the period of the Napoleonic Wars. Nelson's Column in London still commemorates a single commander; it has very large reliefs around the base by different artists, although these are generally regarded as less memorable than other aspects of the monument. Wellington's Column in Liverpool is also known as the "Waterloo Memorial", shifting to the more modern concept when "the dead were remembered essentially as soldiers who fought in the name of national collectives".

The huge losses of the American Civil War saw the first really large group of sculptural war memorials, as well as many monuments for individuals. Among the most artistically outstanding is the Memorial to Robert Gould Shaw and the all-black 54th Regiment by Augustus Saint-Gaudens in Boston, with a second cast in the National Gallery of Art, Washington. The even larger losses of World War I led even small communities in most nations involved to raise some form of memorial, introducing the widespread use of the form to Australia, Canada and New Zealand, the sudden increase in demand leading to a boom for sculptors of public art. Even more than in painting, the war brought a crisis in style, as much public opinion felt the traditional heroic styles inappropriate. One of the most successful British memorials is the starkly realist Royal Artillery Memorial in London, the masterpiece of Charles Sargeant Jagger, who had been wounded three times in the war and spent most of the next decade commemorating it. In the defeated nations of Germany and Austria controversy, which had a political aspect, was especially fierce, and a number of memorials considered excessively modern were removed by the Nazis, whose own memorials, such as the Tannenberg Memorial were removed after World War II. Other solutions were to make memorials more neutral, as in the repurposed Neue Wache in Berlin, since rededicated to different groups several times, and the dignified architectural forms of the Cenotaph in London (widely imitated) and the German Laboe Naval Memorial; tombs of the Unknown Warrior and eternal flames were other ways of avoiding controversy. Some, like the Canadian National War Memorial, and most French memorials, were content to update traditional styles.

A great number of World War I memorials were simply expanded in scope to cover the dead of World War II, and often subsequent conflicts. The now dominant role of photography in depicting war is reflected in the National Iwo Jima Memorial, which recreates the iconic 1945 photograph Raising the Flag on Iwo Jima. The National D-Day Memorial, a project of the 1990s, includes strongly realist sculpture, in contrast to the Vietnam Veterans Memorial in Washington. More innovative memorials have often been erected for the civilian victims of war, above all those of the Holocaust.

== Scope ==
=== Peacetime ===
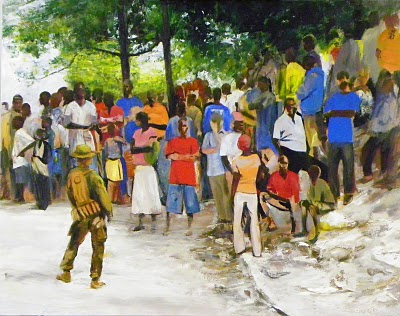
Rice distribution at Carrefour in Haiti after the earthquake in 2010. Oil sketch by Sgt. Kristopher Battles, USMC

Military art encompasses actions of military forces in times of peace. For example, USMC Sgt. Kristopher Battles, the only remaining official American war artist in 2010, deployed with American forces in Haiti to provide humanitarian relief as part of Operation Unified Response after the disastrous earthquake in 2010.

=== Wartime ===
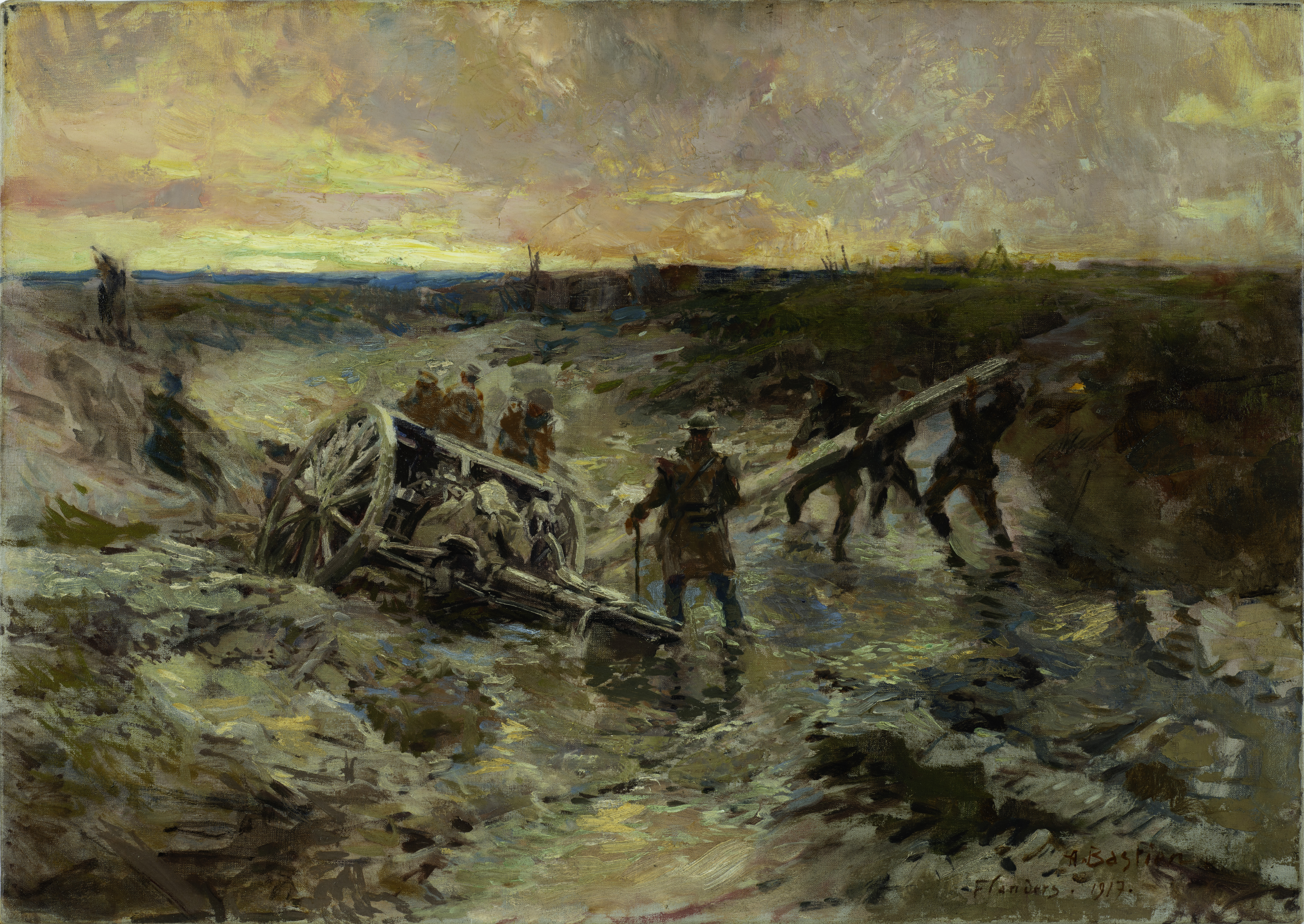
Canadian Gunners in the Mud, Passchendaele by Lieutenant Alfred Bastien, 1917, oil on canvas. Bastien depicts a group of gunners struggling to release one of their guns from the mud. The focus on the gun, rather than on the soldiers, underlines the importance of this weapon to success on the battlefield. – Canadian War Museum

==== Purpose ====
War art creates a visual account of military conflict by showing its impact as men and women are shown waiting, preparing, fighting, suffering, and celebrating.The subjects encompass many aspects of war, and the individual's experience of war, whether allied or enemy, service or civilian, military or political, social or cultural. The thematic range embraces the causes, course and consequences of conflict.

War art, a significant expression of any culture and its significant legacies, combines artistic and documentary functions to provide a pictorial portrayal of war scenes and show "how war shapes lives." It represents an attempt to come to terms with the nature and reality of violence. War art is typically realistic, capturing factual, eyewitness detail as well as the emotional impression and impact of events. Art and war becomes "a tussle between the world of the imagination and the world of action" — a constant tension between the factual representation of events and an artist's interpretation of those events.

Part of the tussle includes determining how best to illustrate complex war scenes. C.E.W. Bean's Anzac Book, for example, influenced Australian artists who grew up between the two world wars. When they were asked to depict a second multi-nation war after 1939, there was a precedent and format for them to follow.

War art has been used as an instrument of propaganda, such as a nation-building function or other persuasive ends. War art is also captured in caricature, which offers contemporary insights. Western Civilization and aesthetic tradition were both clearly marked by military conflicts throughout history. War drove culture and culture drove war. The legacy of war inspired artworks reads like a series of mile markers, documenting the meandering course of civilization's evolutionary map.

==== War artists ====
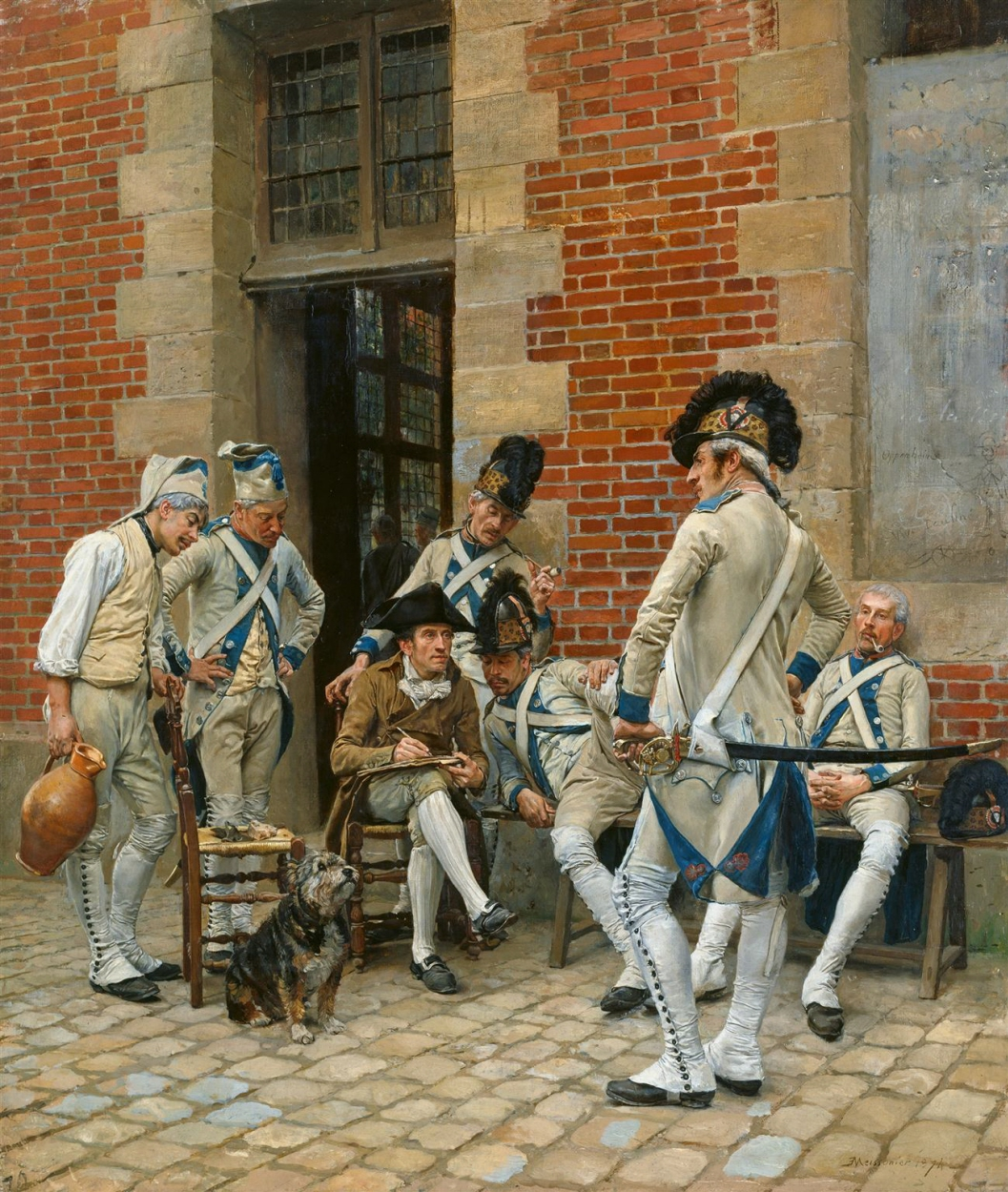
Artist portraying a sergeant (1874), by Ernest Meissonier.

War artists may be involved as onlookers to the scenes, military personnel who respond to powerful inner urges to depict direct war experience, or individuals who are officially commissioned to be present and record military activity.

As an example of nation's efforts to document war events, official Japanese war artists were commissioned to create artwork in the context of a specific war for the Japanese government, including sensō sakusen kirokuga ("war campaign documentary painting"). Between 1937 and 1945, approximately 200 pictures depicting Japan's military campaigns were created. These pictures were presented at large-scale exhibitions during the war years; After the end of World War II, Americans took possession of Japanese artwork.

There are some who may choose not to create war art. During the course of World War II, the Italians created virtually no art which documented the conflict. The French began to paint the war only after the war was ended in 1945.

==== Classical examples ====
Examples of classical war art include the friezes of warriors at the Temple of Aphaia in Greece or the Bayeux Tapestry, is a linear panoramic narrative of the events surrounding the Norman Conquest and the Battle of Hastings in 1066.

== Gallery ==
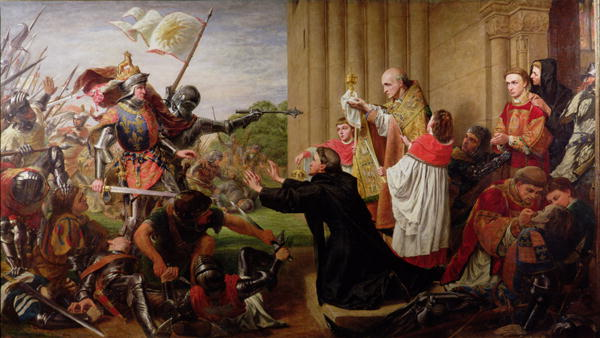
Sanctuary — Edward IV and Lancastrian Fugitives at Tewkesbury Abbey by Richard Burchett, UK, 1867. This was an incident during the War of the Roses

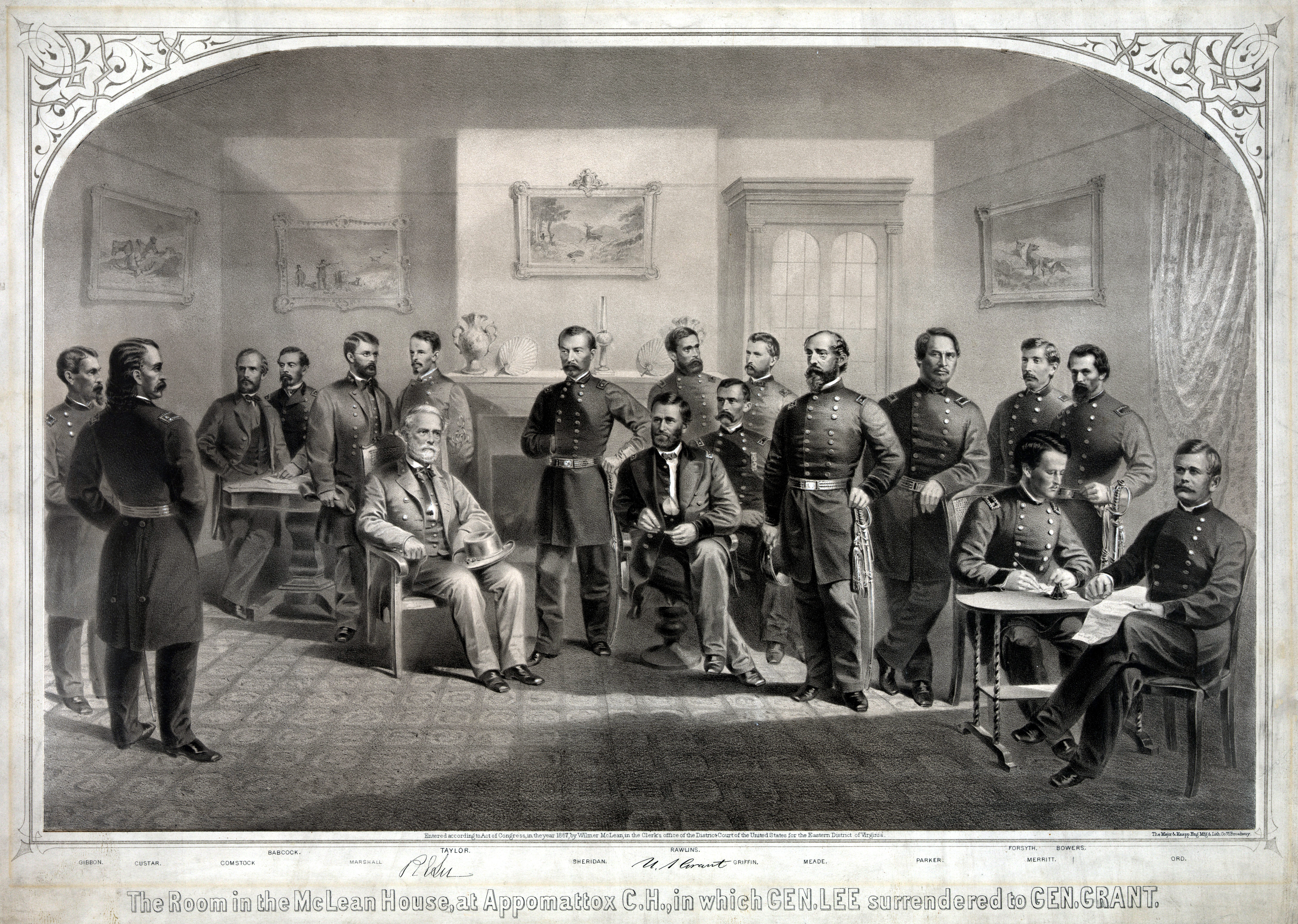
The Room in the McLean House, at Appomattox C.H., in which Gen. Lee surrendered to Gen. Grant, 9 April 1865. This lithograph of the event shows the two men as they waited for the peace terms to be copied. Officers shown here Portraits, left to right: John Gibbon, George Armstrong Custer, Cyrus B. Comstock, Orville E. Babcock, Charles Marshall, Walter H. Taylor, Robert E. Lee, Philip Sheridan, Ulysses S. Grant, John Aaron Rawlins, Charles Griffin, unidentified, George Meade, Ely S. Parker, James W. Forsyth, Wesley Merritt, Theodore Shelton Bowers, Edward Ord. The man not identified in the picture's legend is thought to be General Joshua Chamberlain, who presided over the formal surrender of arms by Lee's Army of Northern Virginia on 12 April 1865.

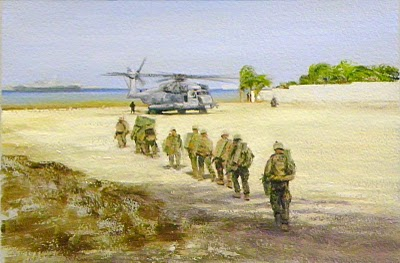
Marines lug their packs out to the waiting helo in Haiti in 2010. Sketch by Battles, USMC

Destroy this mad brute — Enlist U.S. Army (Harry R. Hopps; 1917)

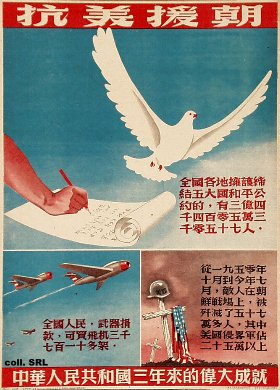
"Great achievements of the PRC in the past 3 years” (334,053,057 people supporting a P5 peace treaty, mass donation worth 3,710+ fighters, 570,000+ enemy casualties including 250,000+ American invaders), a poster in mainland China about the Korean War, circa 1950s

=== Cavalry ===
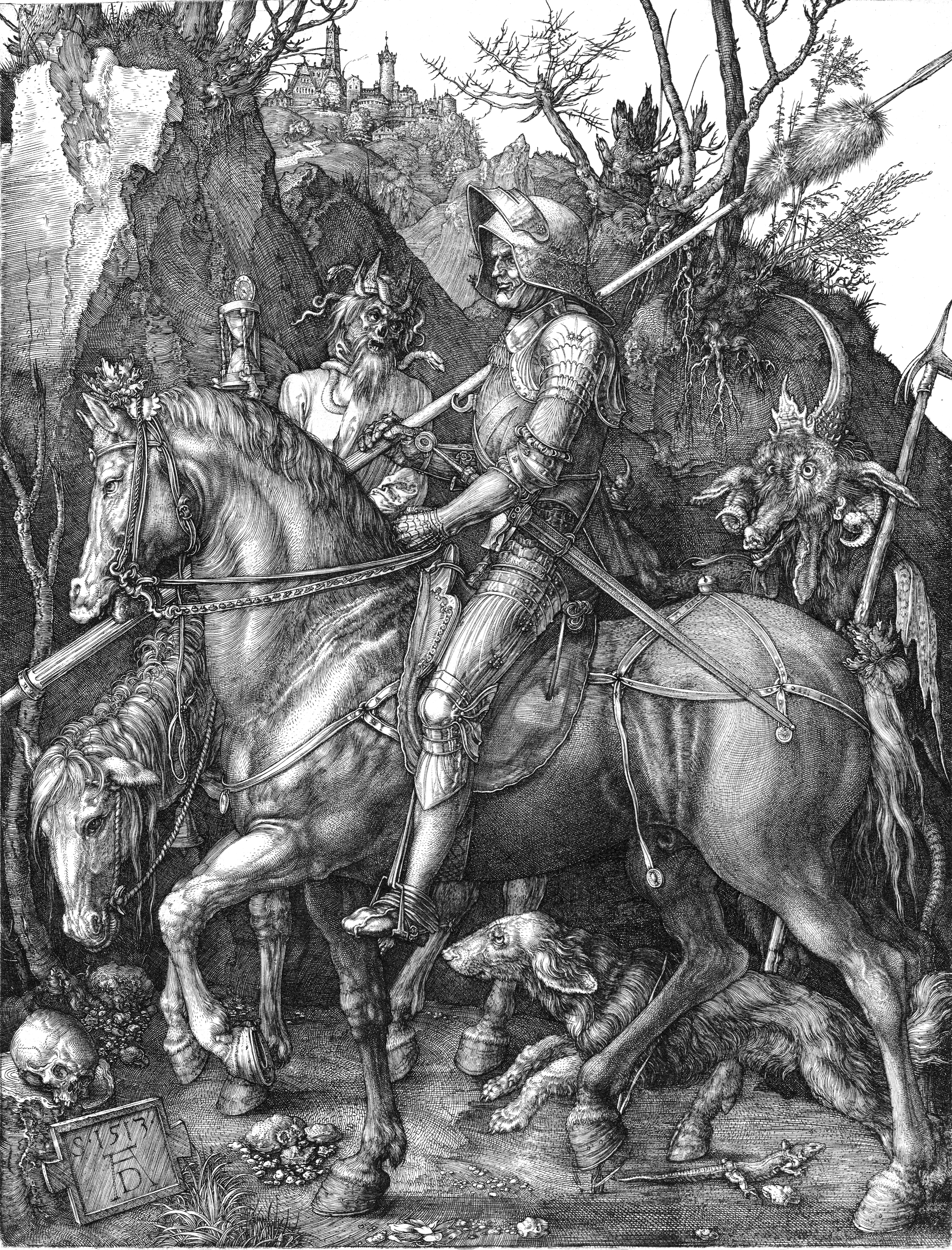
Knight, Death and the Devil by Albrecht Dürer, 16th century.

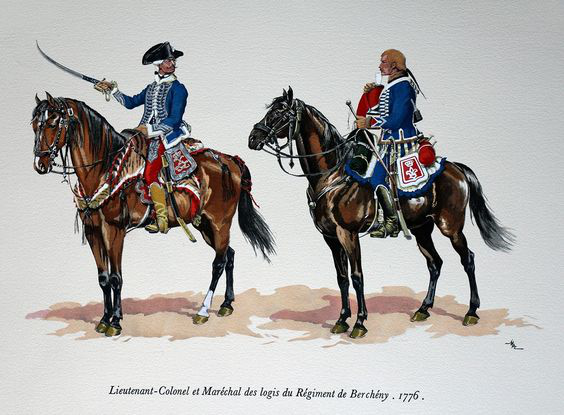
Bercheny's Hussars, French light cavalry, 1776.

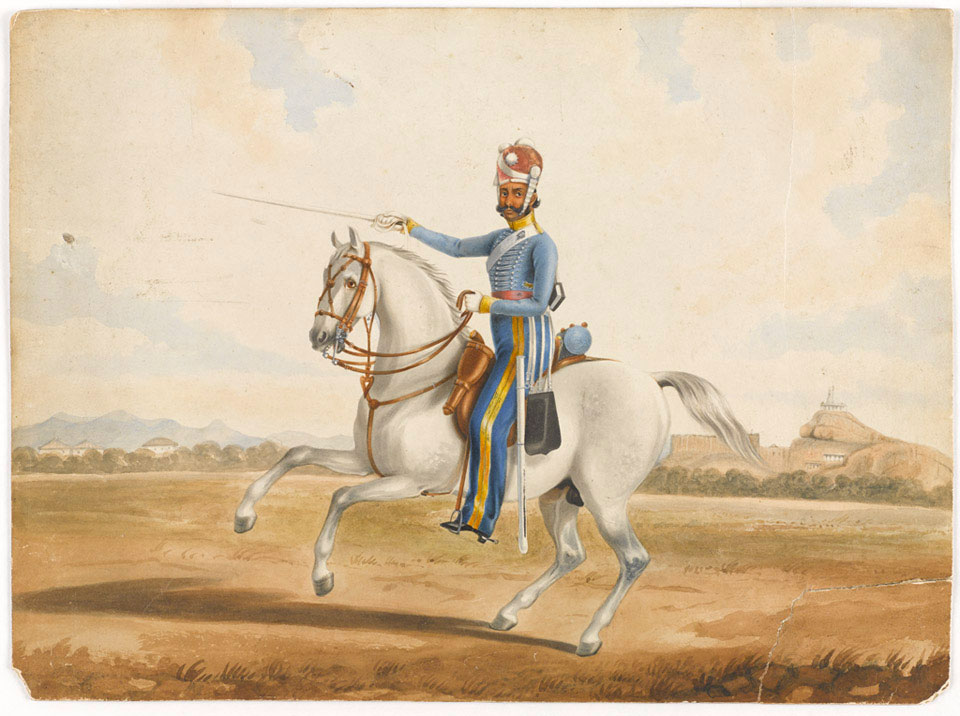
c. 1847 painting of a Madras Army sowar

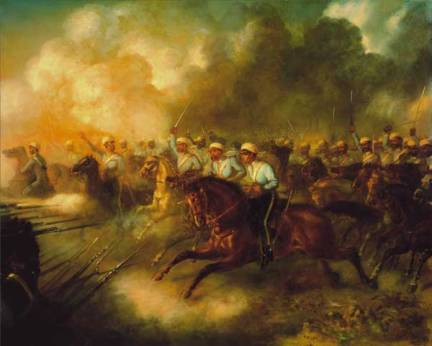
Cavalry at the Battle of Kooshab during the Anglo-Persian War, circa 1850s.

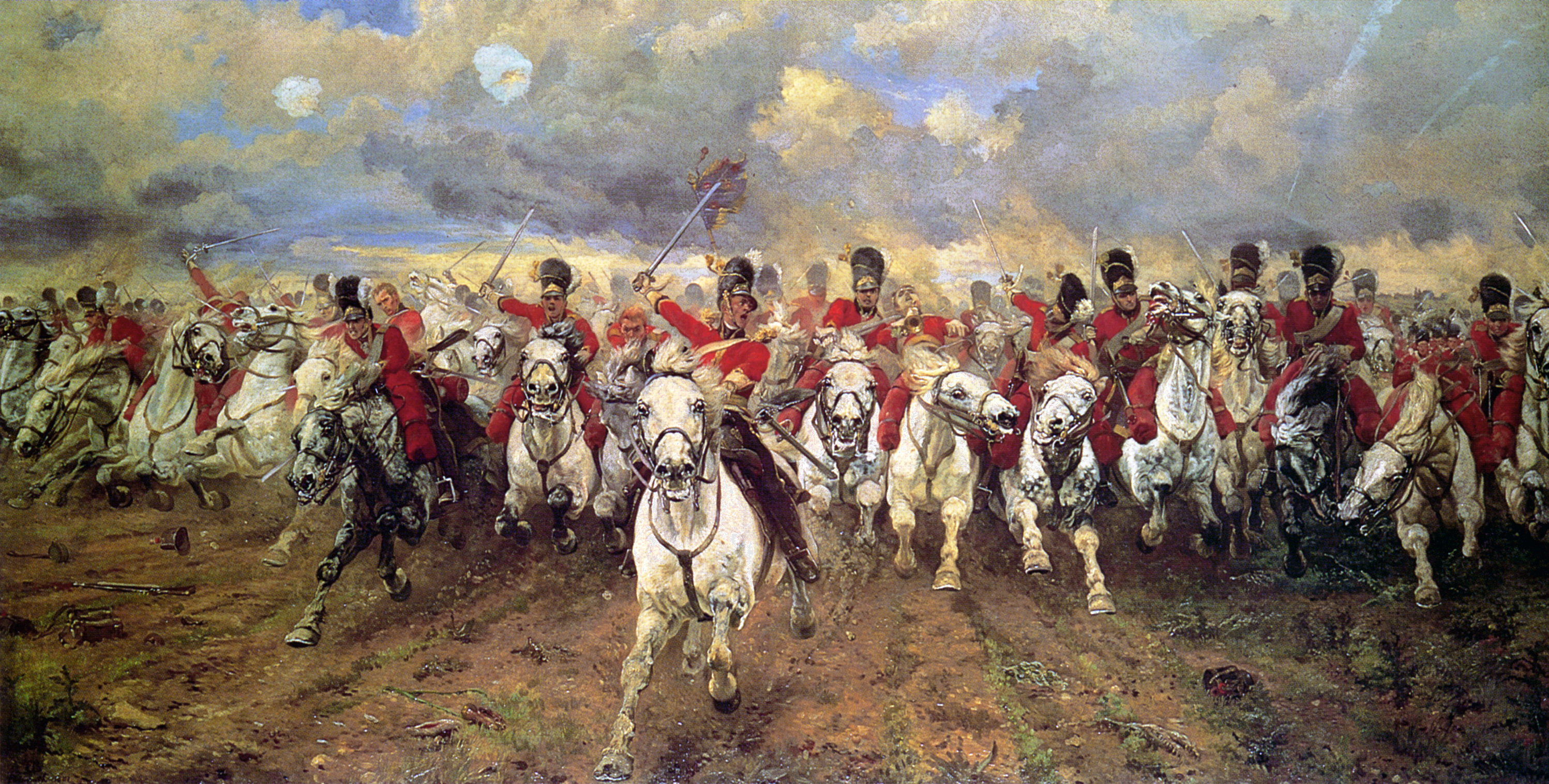
Scotland Forever!, depicting the start of the charge by the Royal Scots Greys at the Battle of Waterloo, by Elizabeth Thompson, 1881.

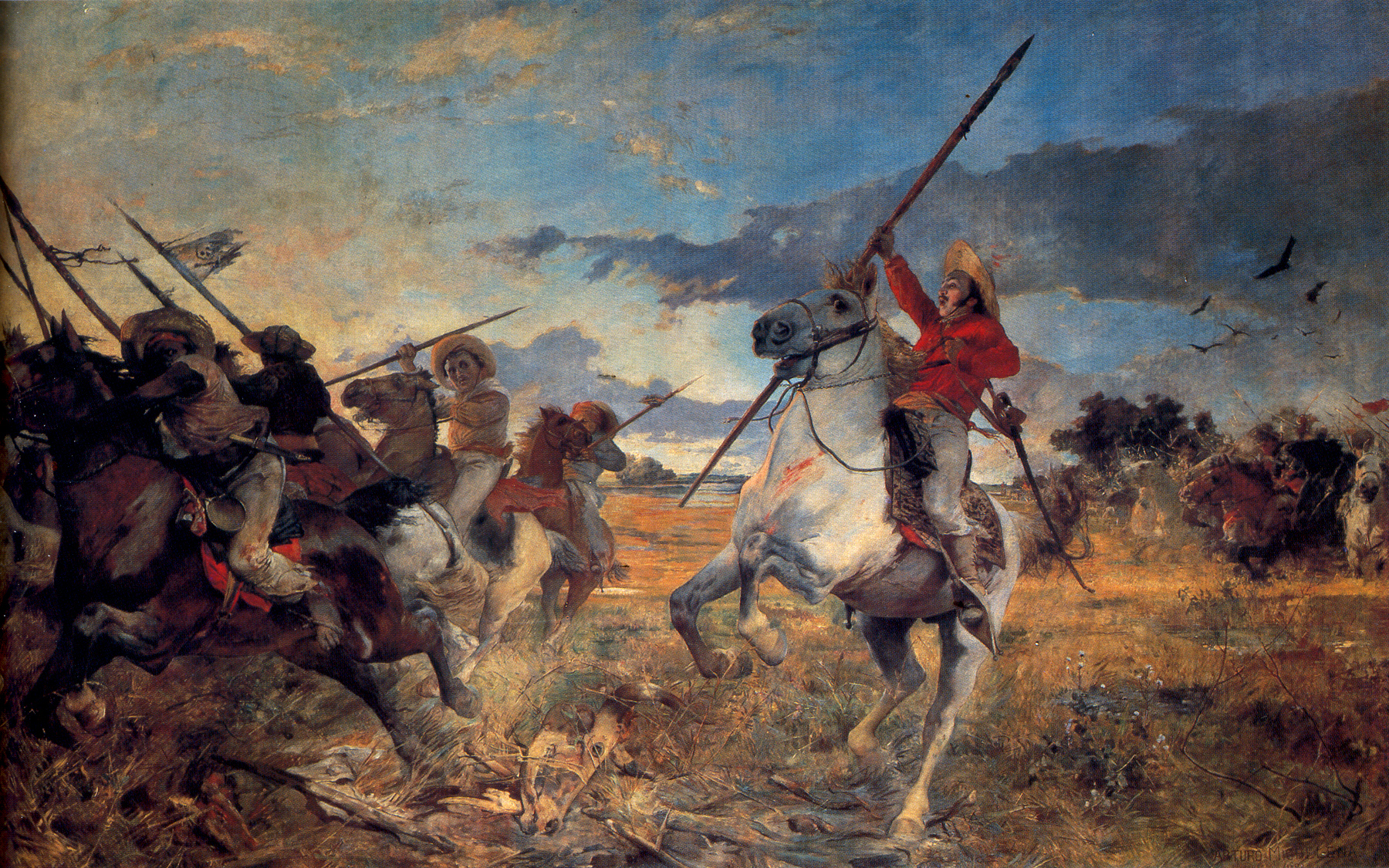
Vuelvan Caras at the Battle of Las Queseras del Medio, by Arturo Michelena, 1890. This was a crucial battle in the Venezuelan War of Independence.

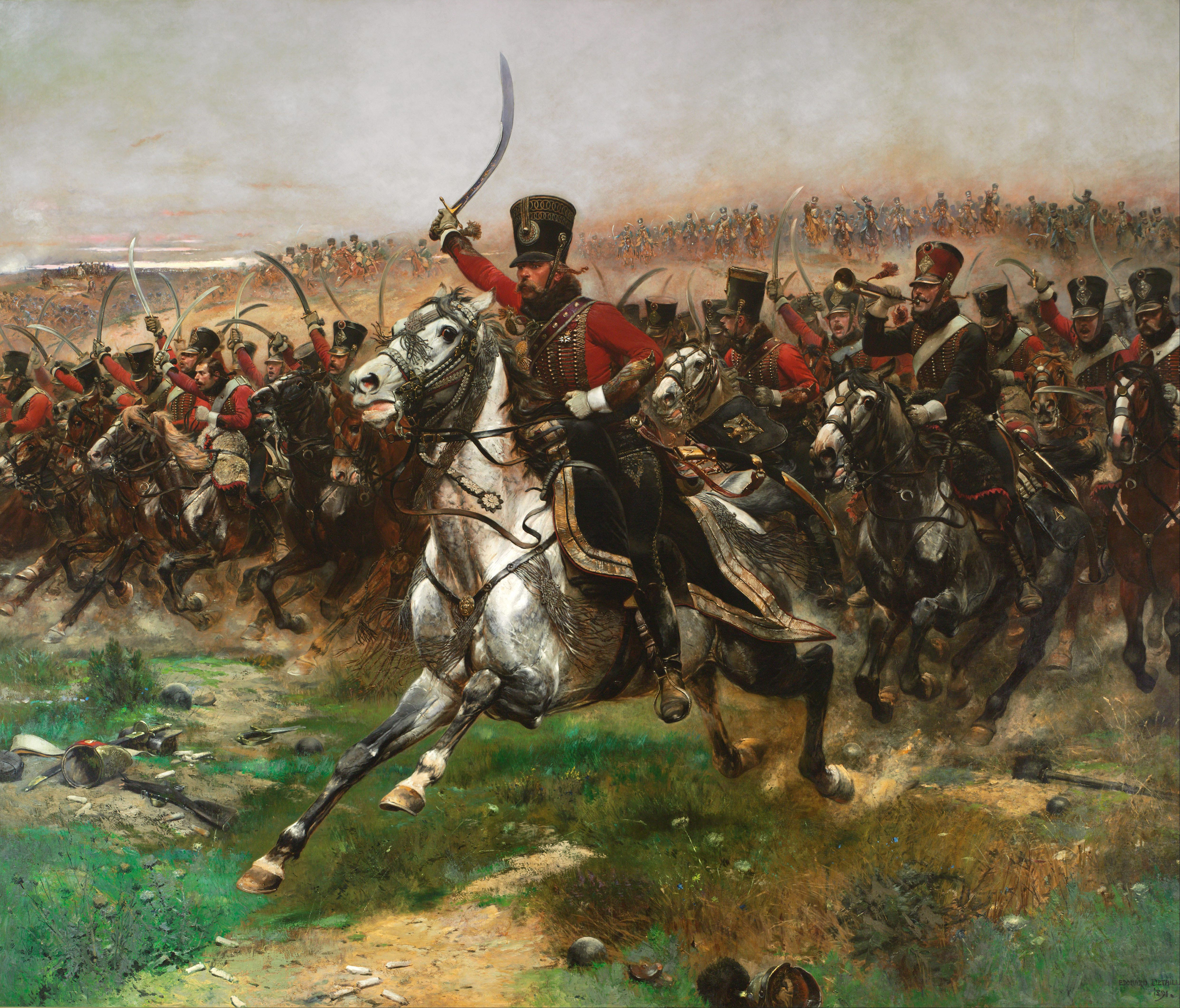
The French 4th Hussars at the Battle of Friedland, by Edouard Detaille, 1891.

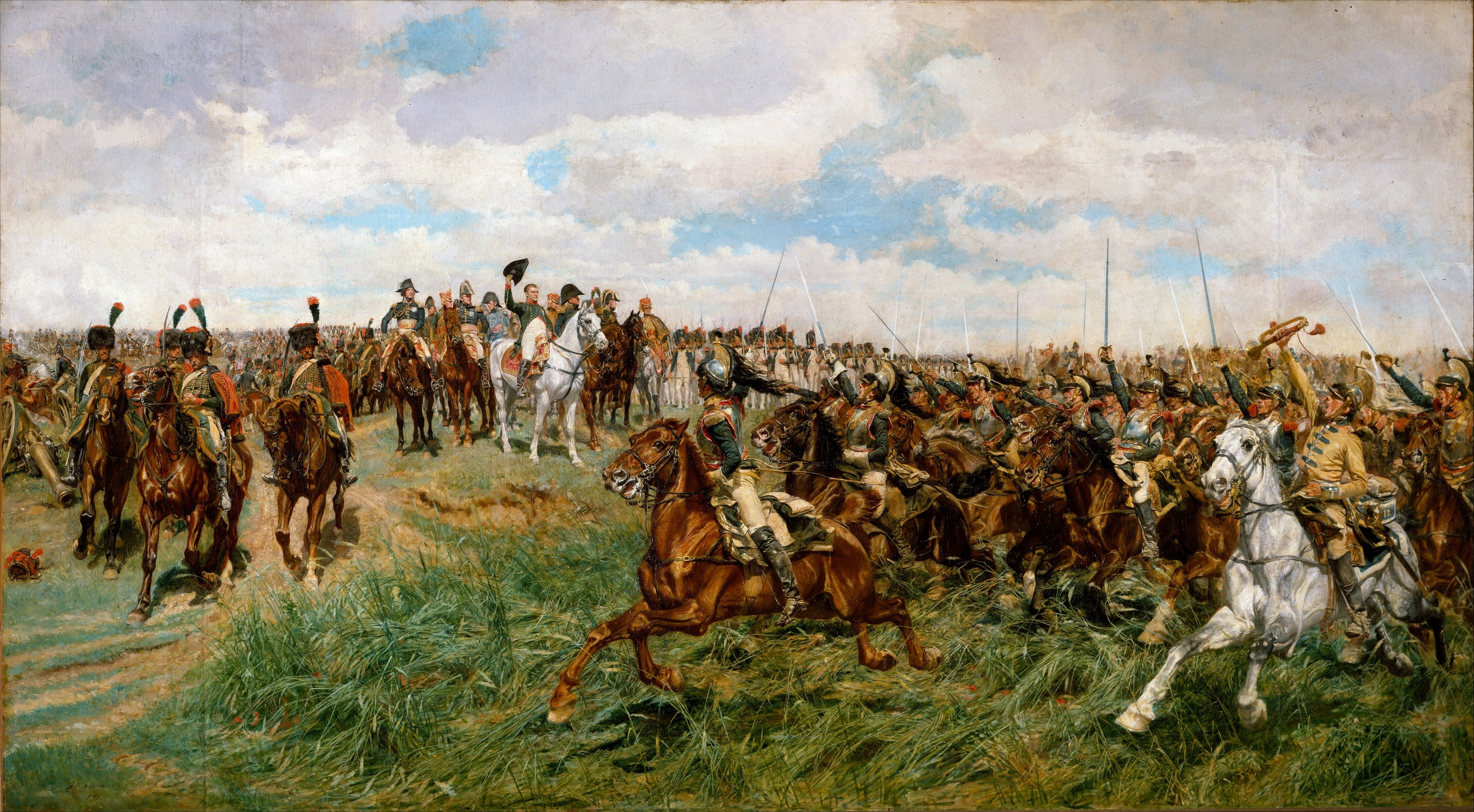
Cuirassiers saluting Napoleon at the Battle of Friedland (1807), by Ernest Meissonier, 1875.

=== Offering a drink of water to a fallen soldier ===
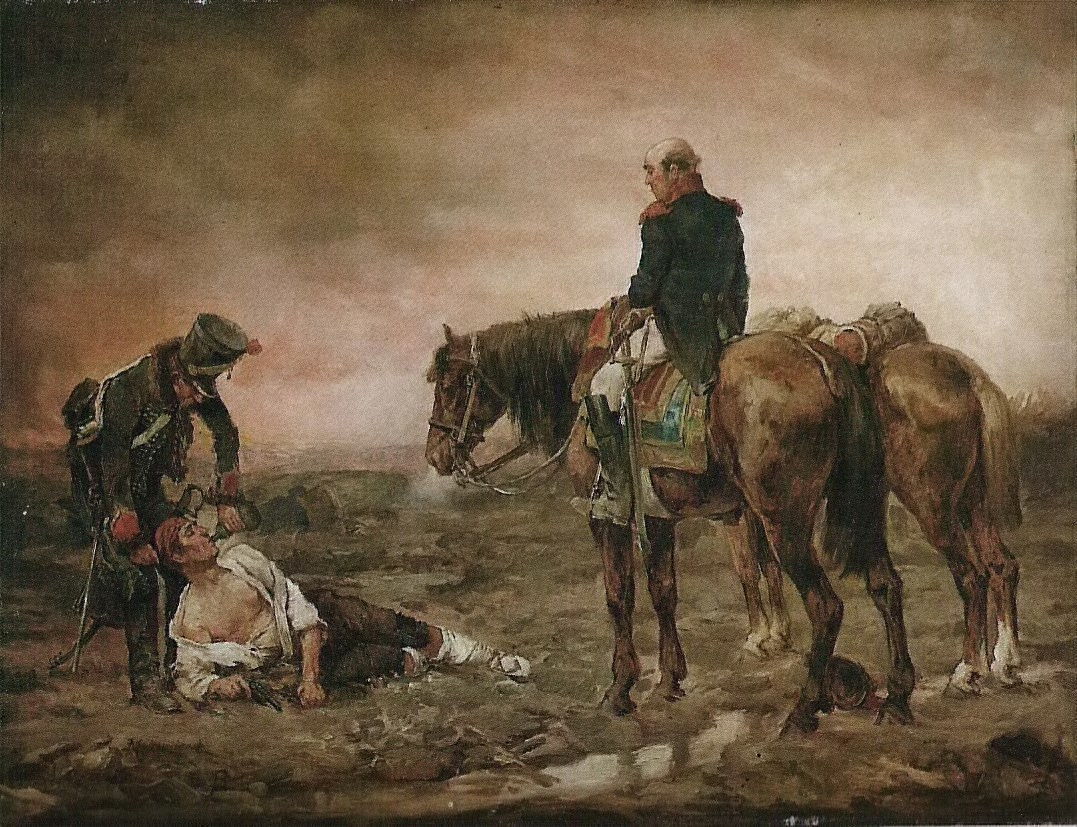
Relief after the battle by Jean-Louis-Ernest Meissonier, 19th century

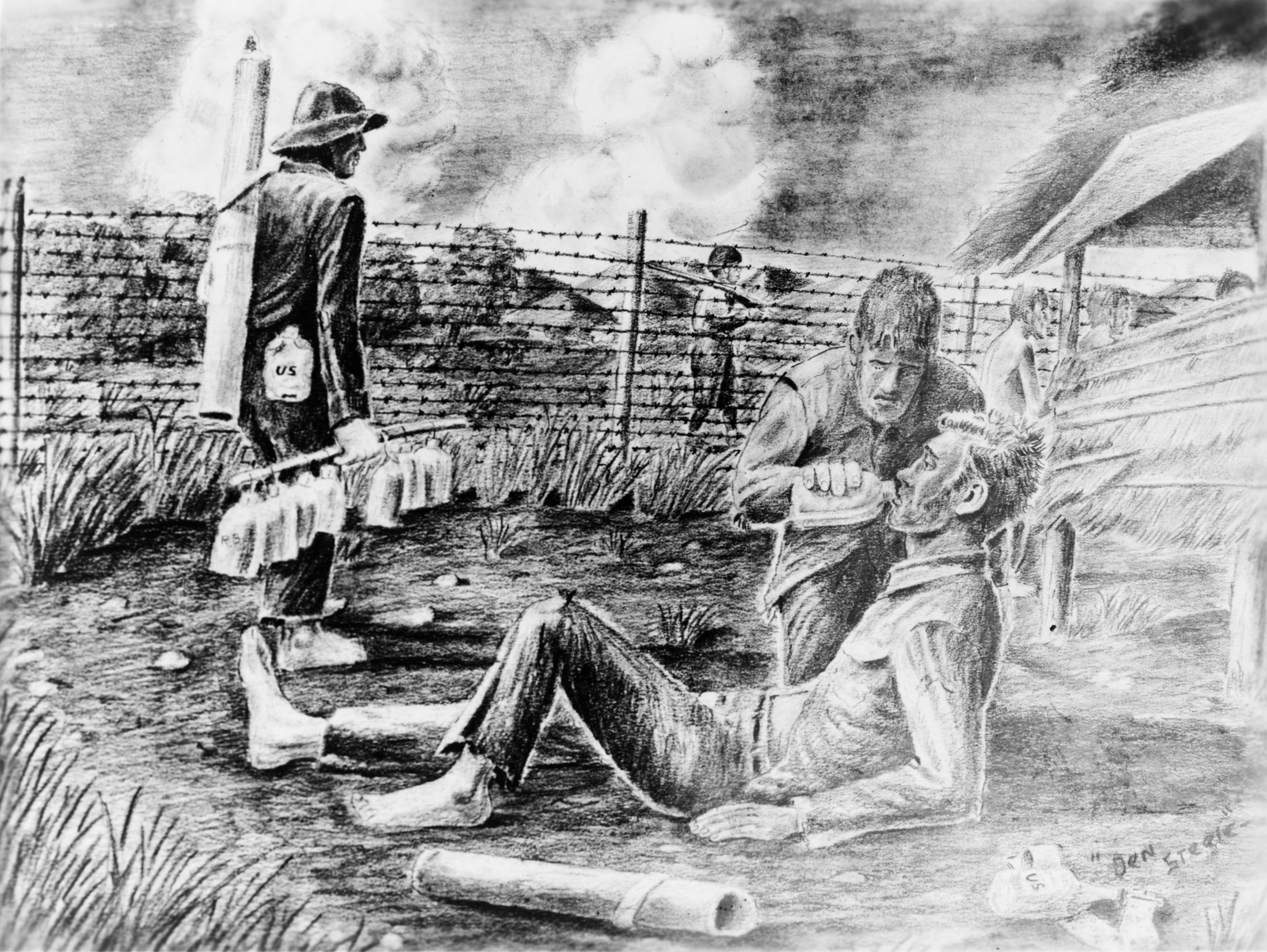
Sketch showing American POWs in a Japanese prison camp in the Philippines, 1945

=== River crossings ===
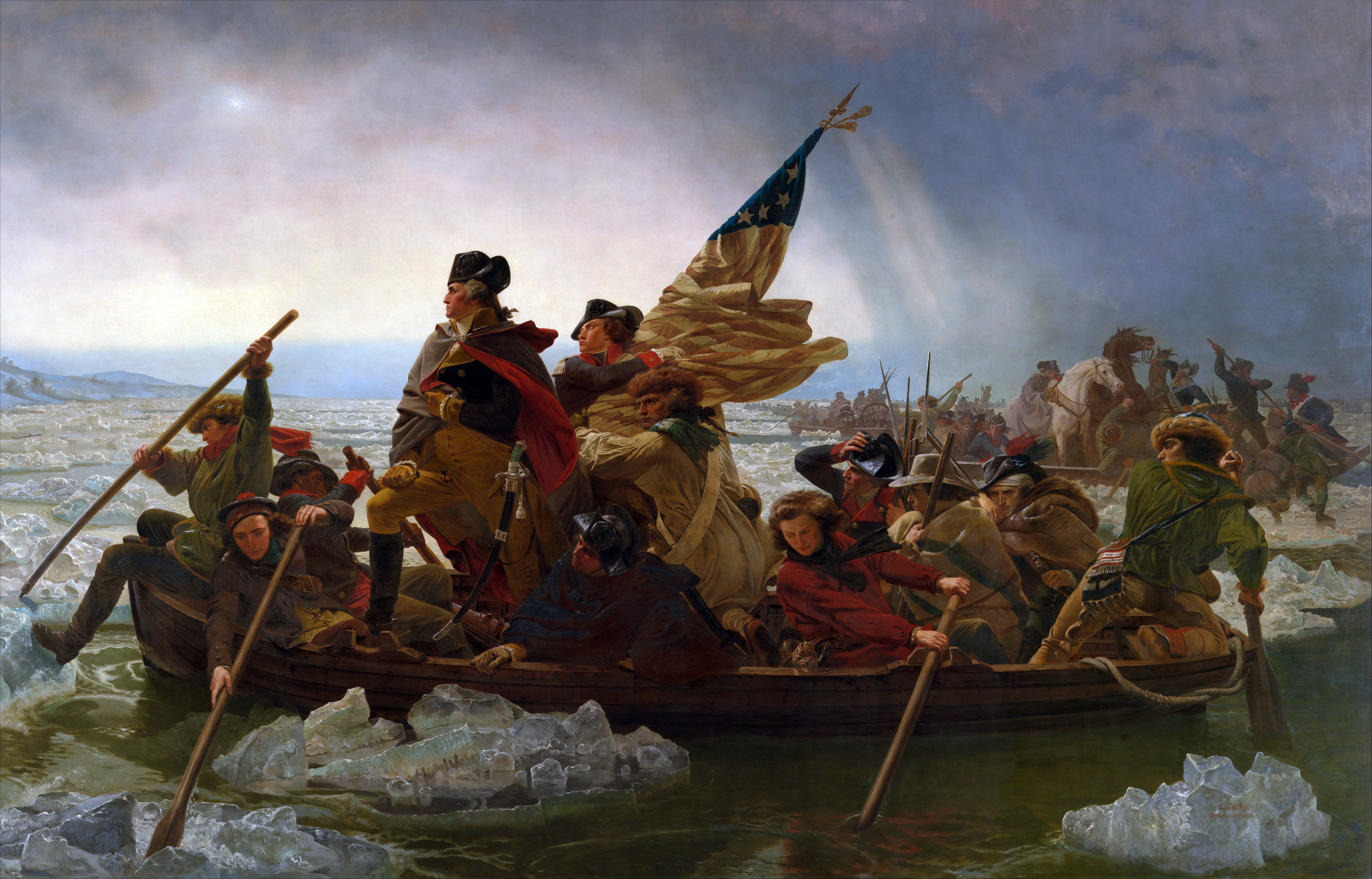
Washington Crossing the Delaware on the night of December 25–26, 1776, painted by Emanuel Leutze in Düsseldorf in 1850.

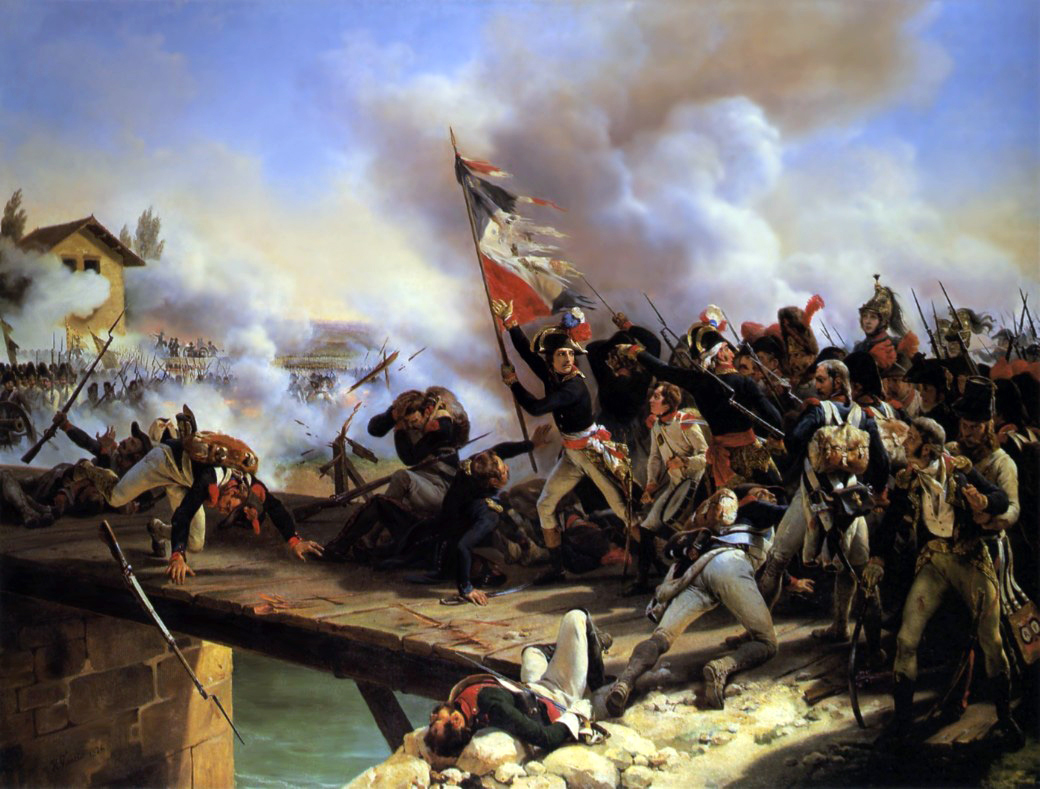
Napoleon Bonaparte crossing the bridge of Arcole in 1796. The Crossing of the Arcole Bridge by Horace Vernet (1826)

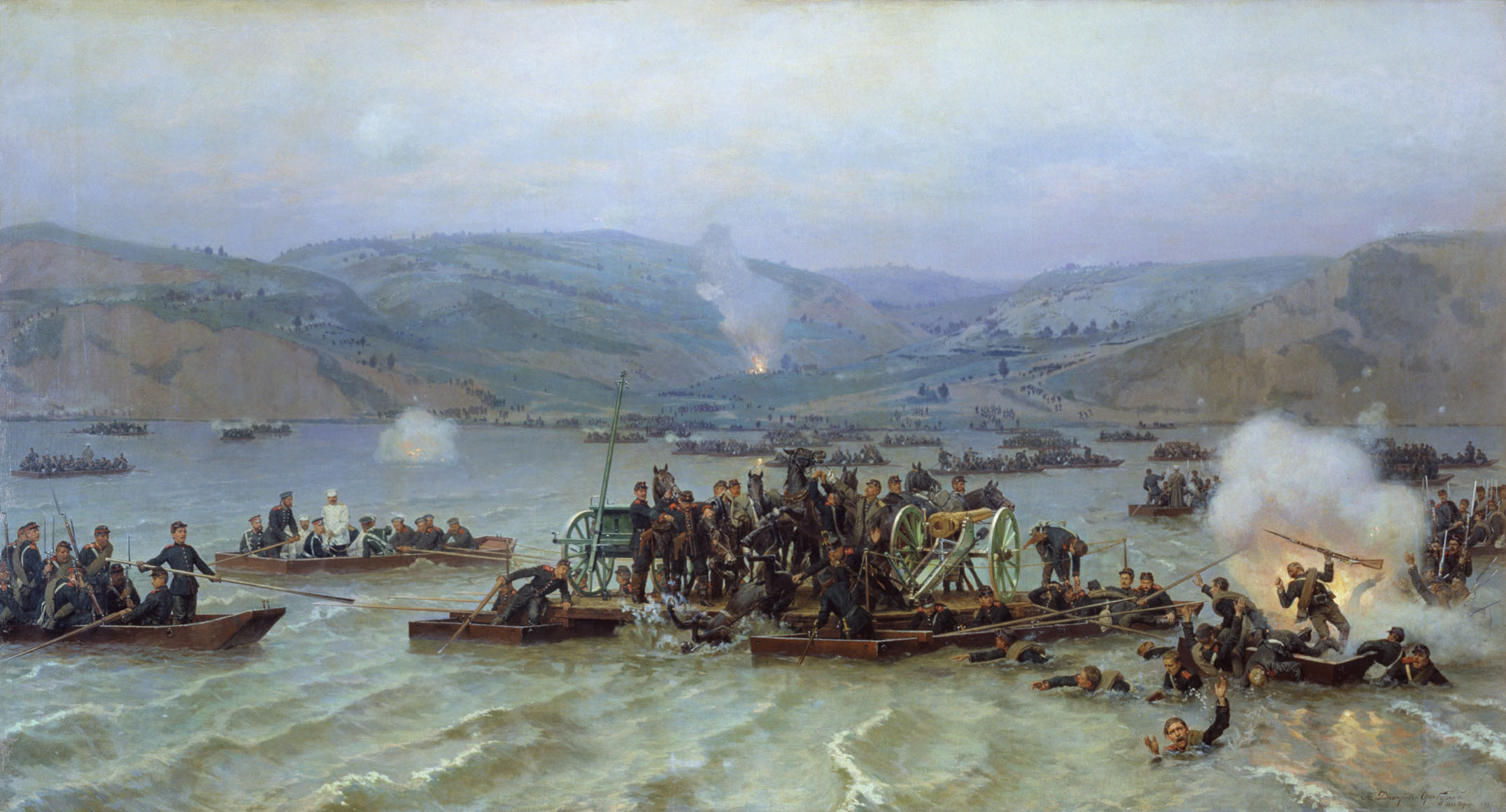
The Russian crossing of Danube near Zimnitsa on 15 June 1877, painted by Nikolai Dmitriev-Orenburgsky in Paris in 1883

=== Propaganda ===
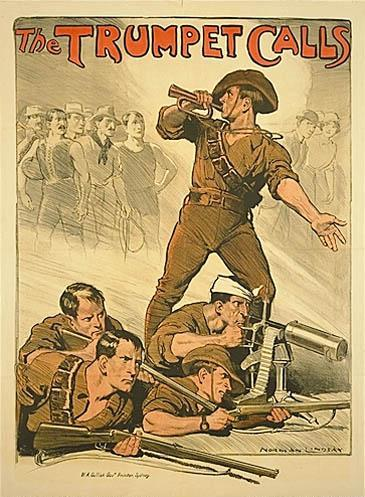
Trumpet calls by Norman Lindsay, Australia, 1914–1918

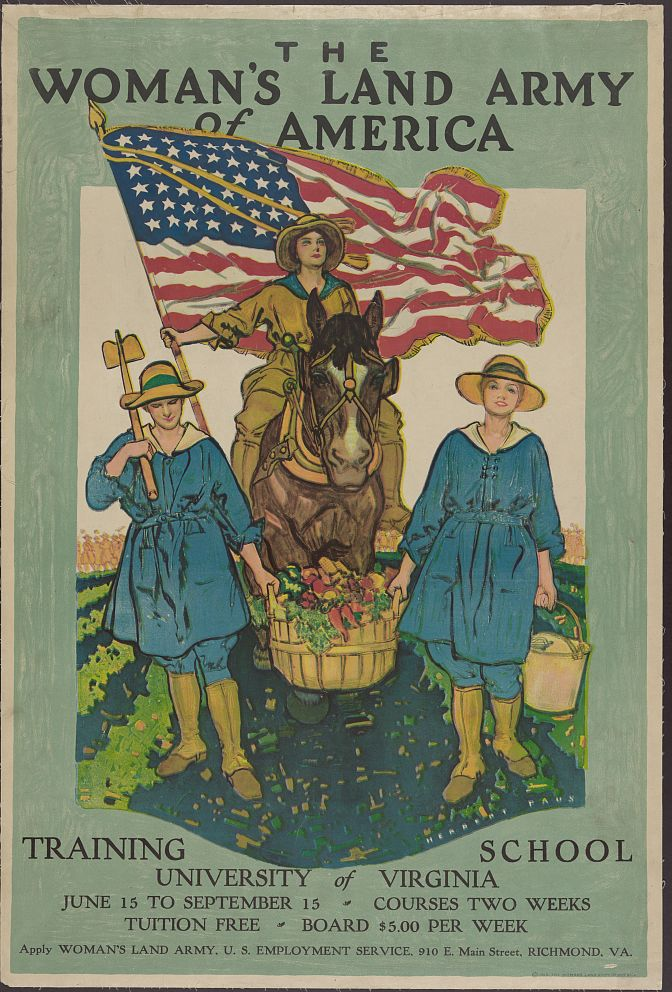
The Woman's Land Army of America, US, 1918

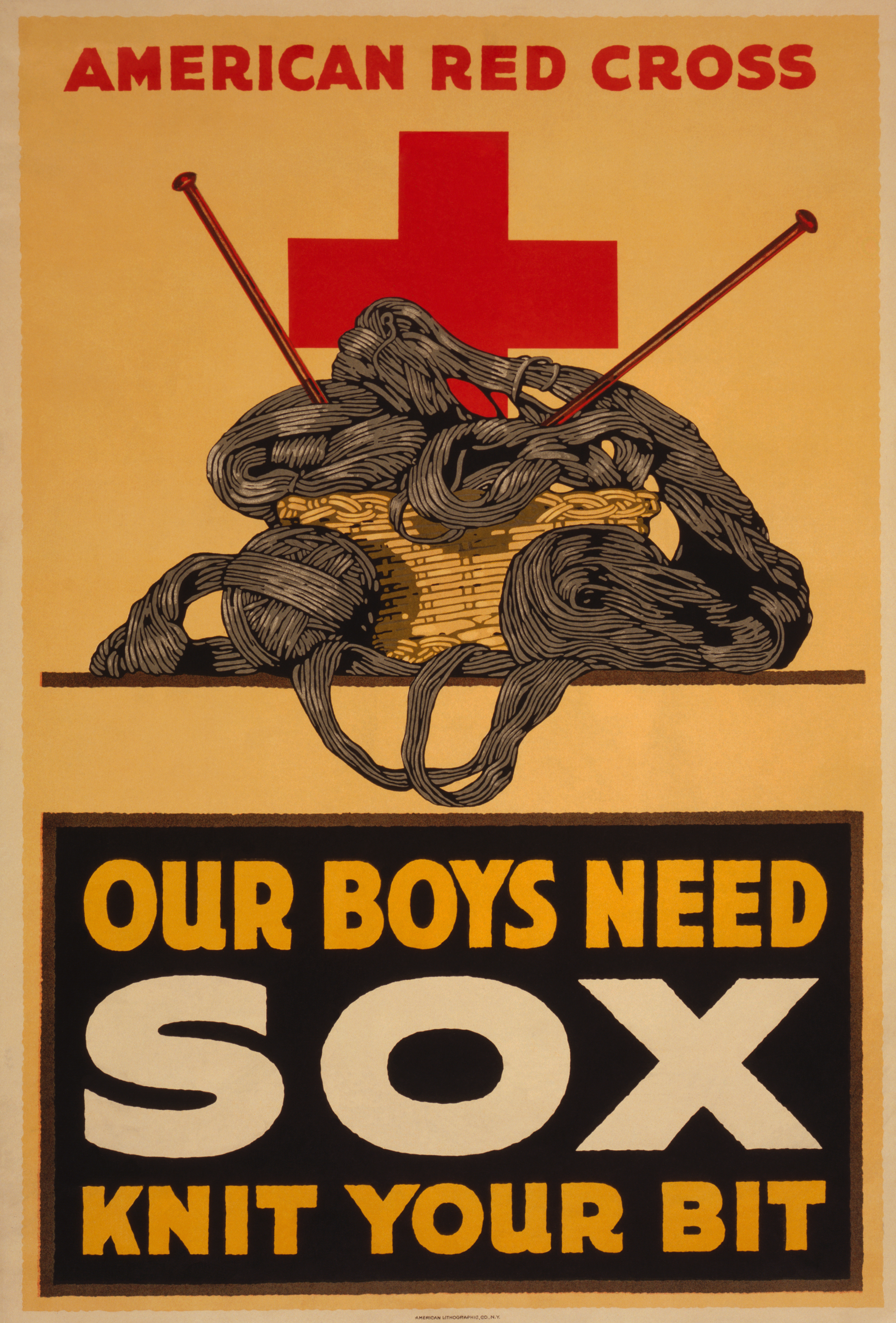
Our boys need sox - knit your bit, US, 1917–1918

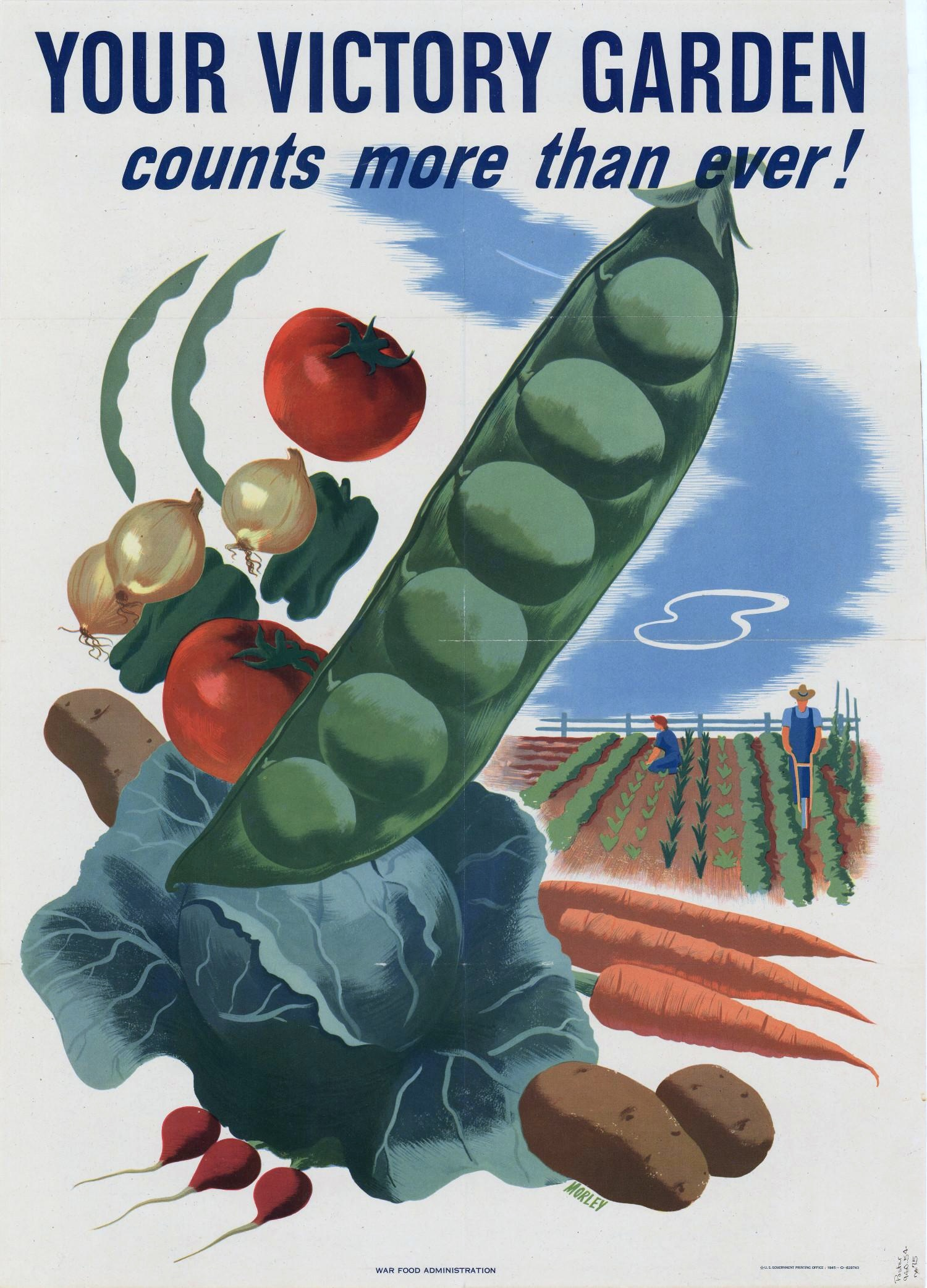
Victory garden poster, US, 1945

== See also ==
- War artists
  - American official war artists
  - Australian official war artists
  - British official war artists
  - Canadian official war artists
  - German official war artists
  - Japanese official war artists
  - New Zealander official war artists
- Heraldry
- The Horse in Art
- Militaria
- War photography
- War rugs, a recent tradition of Afghanistan
