= Gorō Tsuruta =

Japanese painter (1890–1969)

Gorō Tsuruta (鶴田 吾郎, Tsuruta Gorō; July 8, 1890 – January 1, 1969) was a Japanese painter of the yōga (or Western-style) movement and a member of the Japan Fine Arts Exhibition.

== Biography ==
Tsuruta was born in Tokyo. After dropping out of Waseda University, he studied a foreign painting under Hakuyō Kurata. After that, he entered the Hakuba Association Movie Research Institute where studied an oil painting under Nakamura's tutoring. He was a member of the artists' circles Hakubakai, Taiheiyō Bijutsu, and Shigenki. After working at the advertising department of Ajinomoto Co., he joined Kyosu Nichigo in 1912. In 1915 he founded a sketch club with Riko Kawabata, and in 1917 he was responsible for lecture recording of communication education and published a print collection Sketch club art collection. He traveled a lot in Japan, Russia, Europe and produced many landscape paintings.

Between 1913 and 1920, Tsuruta lived in Korea, Manchuria and Syberia. His Portrait of the Blind Eroshenko (盲目のエロシェンコ像, Mōmoku no eroshenko zō) was selected for the 2nd Imperial Academy Art Exhibition. Since then, he participated in Tei exhibition, literary exhibition and Nissan exhibition. Beginning from 1926 he published works of new prints such as Fisher of Kujukuri from the Kato print shop.

During the period 1937-1940 he posted texts in addition to drawings, sketches in the satirical print magazine Kalikare. In 1938 he was studying stencils.

In 1942, during the Pacific theater of World War II, Tsuruta commemorated the active role of airborne Army and Naval units and the celebrated aerial attack on Palembang by Army paratroopers in his war scene Divine Soldiers Descend on Palembang (神兵パレンバンに降下す, Shinpei parenban ni koukasu). After the World War II, he traveled across Japan and visited various national parks where he drew landscapes. His landscapes include about 30 Japanese National Park series.

Tsuruta served as a judge at the Bunten Exhibition, and established the Japan Mountain Forest Fine Arts Association (日本山林美術協会, Nihon kinrin bijutsu kyōkai).

== Books ==
- "Sobyō no tabi" (素描の旅), Mokuseisha Shoin, 1931
- "Saishūtō no shizen to fūbutsu" (済州島の自然と風物), Chūō Chōsen Kyōkai, 1935
- "Hanseiki no sobyō" (半世紀の素描), Chūō Kōron Bijutsu Shuppan, 1982
