= War artist =

Artist who records their experience of war

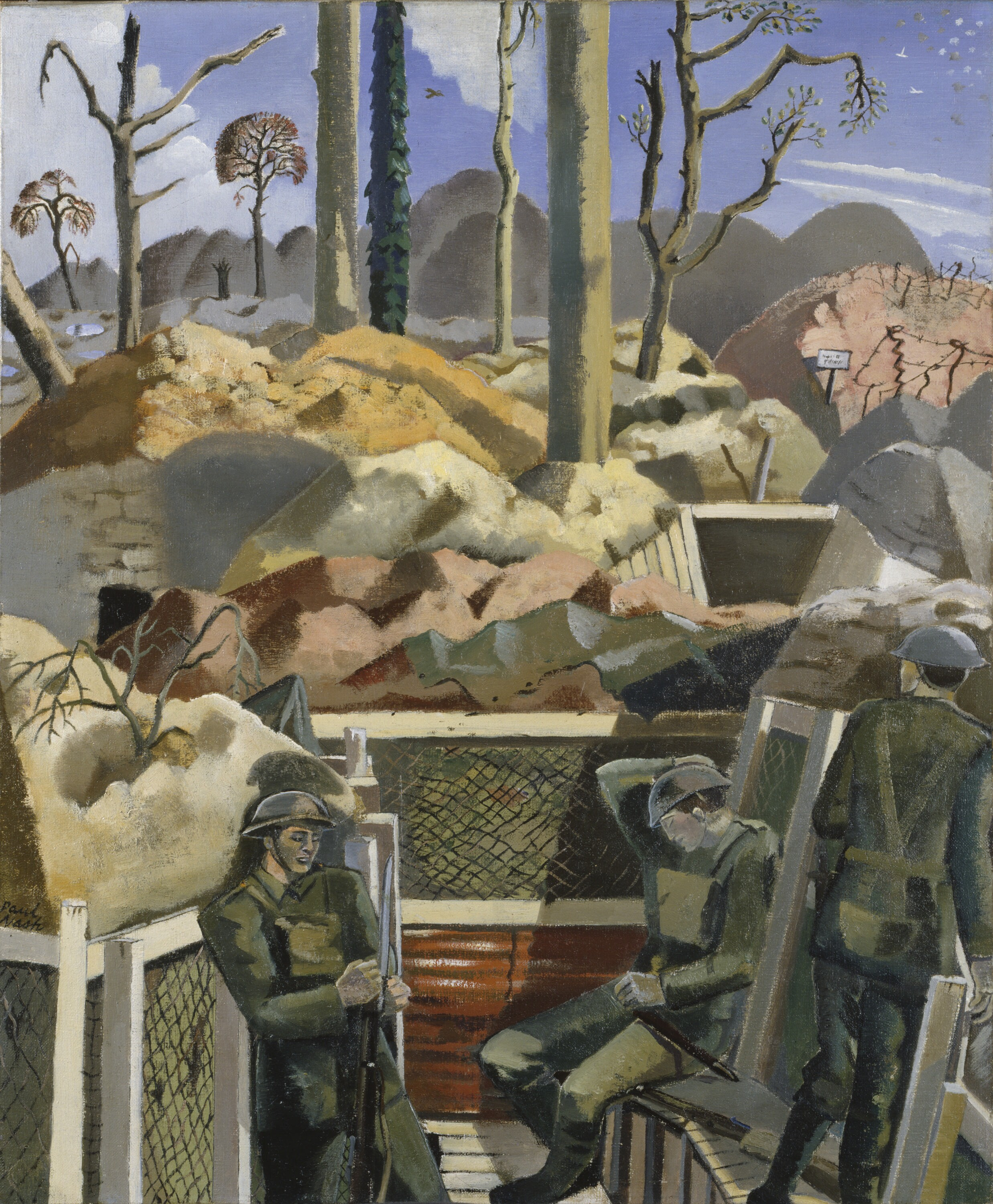
Spring in the Trenches, Ridge Wood, 1917 by Paul Nash. Nash was a war artist in both World War I and World War II

A war artist is an artist either commissioned by a government or publication, or self-motivated, to document first-hand experience of war in any form of illustrative or depictive record. War artists explore the visual and sensory dimensions of war, often absent in written histories or other accounts of warfare.

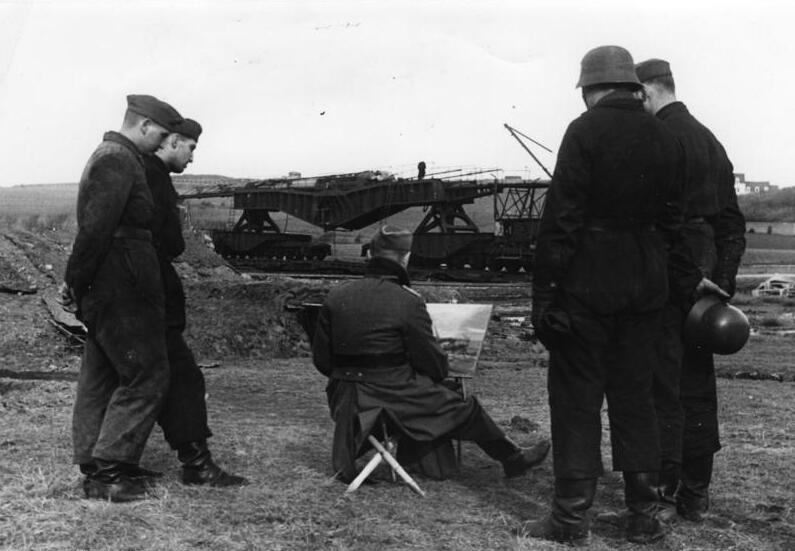
A war artist in German-occupied France in 1941

These artists may be involved in war as onlookers to the scenes, military personnel, or as specifically commissioned to be present and record military activity.

Artists record military activities in ways that cameras and the written word cannot. Their art collects and distills the experiences of the people who endured it. The artists and their artwork affect how subsequent generations view military conflicts. For example, Australian war artists who grew up between the two world wars were influenced by the artwork which depicted the First World War, and there was a precedent and format for them to follow.

Official war artists have been appointed by governments for information or propaganda purposes and to record events on the battlefield, but there are many other types of war artists. These can include combatants who are artists and choose to record their experiences, non-combatants who are witnesses of war, and prisoners of war who may voluntarily record the conditions or be appointed war artists by senior officers.

In New Zealand, the title of appointed "war artist" is "army artist". In the United States, the term "combat artist" has come to be used to mean the same thing.

== Some examples and their background ==
- William Simpson was an artist-correspondent who sent artwork to London from the front during the Crimean War.
- Alfred Waud was an American Civil War pictorial newspaper illustrator.
- Ogata Gekkō and Tsuguharu Foujita created woodblock prints for Japanese publications.
- Ronald Searle recorded life in Japanese POW camps.
- Emmanuel Leutze's 1851 studio painting of Washington Crossing the Delaware is historically incorrect, and Leutze was born decades after the event his painting depicts, but this work has become an icon of popular culture.

== War artists by nationality ==
=== Argentine ===
- Cándido López, 1840–1902, Paraguayan War

=== Australian ===
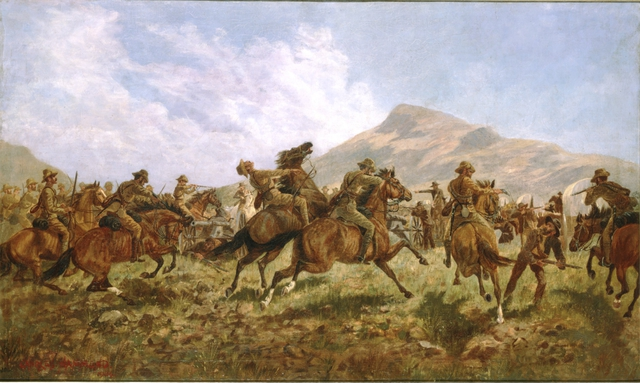
Australians and New Zealanders at Klerksdorp 24 March 1901 by Charles Hammond

War artists have depicted all the conflicts in which Australians have been called to combat. The Australian tradition of "official war artists" started with the First World War. Artists were granted permission to accompany the Australian Imperial Force to record the activities of its soldiers. During the Second World War, the Australian War Museum, later called the Australian War Memorial, engaged artists. At the same time, the Royal Australian Navy, Australian Army, and Royal Australian Air Force appointed official war artist-soldiers from within their ranks. These embedded war artists have depicted the activities of Australian forces in Korea, Vietnam, East Timor, Afghanistan, and Iraq.

The ranks of non-soldier artists like George Gittoes continue to create artwork which becomes a commentary on Australia's military actions in war.

Selected artists
A select list of representative Australian artists includes:

==== Second Boer War ====
- William Dargie CBE, 1912–2003

==== First World War ====
- George Bell, 1878–1966
- Charles Bryant, 1883–1937
- Will Dyson, 1880–1938
- A. Henry Fullwood, 1863–1930
- George Lambert ARA, 1873–1930
- Fred Leist, 1878–1945
- John Longstaff, 1862–1941
- Louis McCubbin, 1890–1952
- Harold Septimus Power, 1877–1951
- James Quinn, 1869–1951
- Arthur Streeton, 1867–1943

==== Second World War ====
- Stella Bowen, 1893–1947
- Ernest Buckmaster, 1897-1968
- Norma Bull, 1906-1980
- Colin Colahan, 1897–1987
- William Dargie CBE, 1912–2003
- William Dobell OBE, 1899–1970
- Russell Drysdale AC, 1912–1981
- Richard Eurich OBE RA, 1903–1992
- Murray Griffin, 1903–1992
- Harold Herbert, 1891–1945
- Ivor Hele, 1912–1993
- Nora Heysen AM, 1911–2003
- Frank Hodgkinson AM, 1919–2001
- Rex Julius, 1914-1944
- Alan Moore, 1914-2015
- Sydney Nolan OM AC, 1917–1992
- William Edwin Pidgeon, 1909–1981
- Grace Cossington Smith AO, 1892–1984

==== Recent conflicts ====
- Rick Amor, b. 1948, Peacekeeping in East Timor
- Conway Bown, b. 1966, Australian Army War Artist
- Peter Churcher, b. 1964, war on terrorism
- George Gittoes AM, b. 1949
- Shaun Gladwell, b. 1972, War in Afghanistan
- Ivor Hele, 1912–1993, Korean War
- Ken McFadyen, 1932–1998, Vietnam War
- Lewis Miller, b. 1959, War in Iraq
- Frank Norton, 1916–1983, Korean War
- Wendy Sharpe, b. 1960, Peacekeeping in East Timor

=== Austrian ===
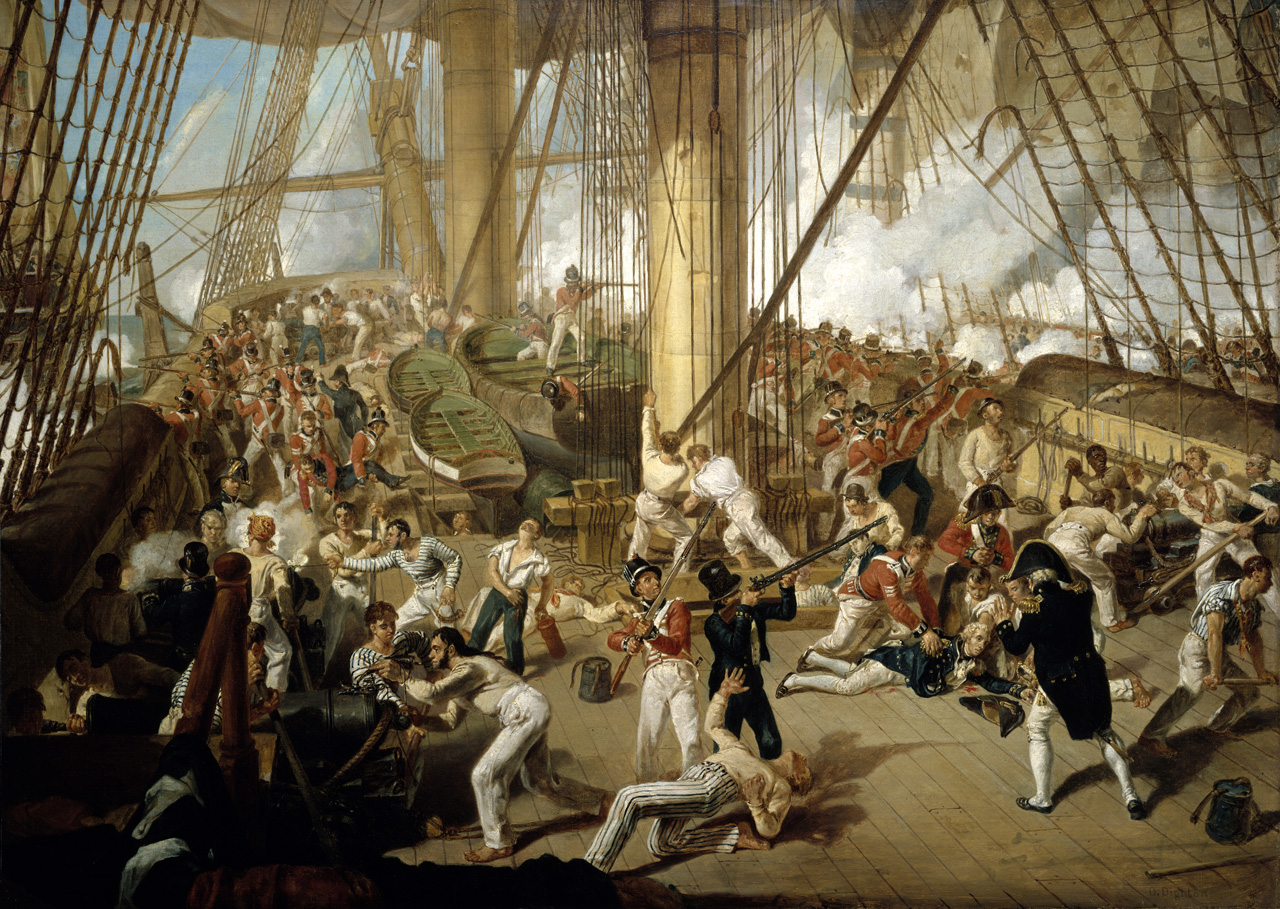
The Fall of Nelson, Battle of Trafalgar, 21 October 1805 by Denis Dighton, c. 1825

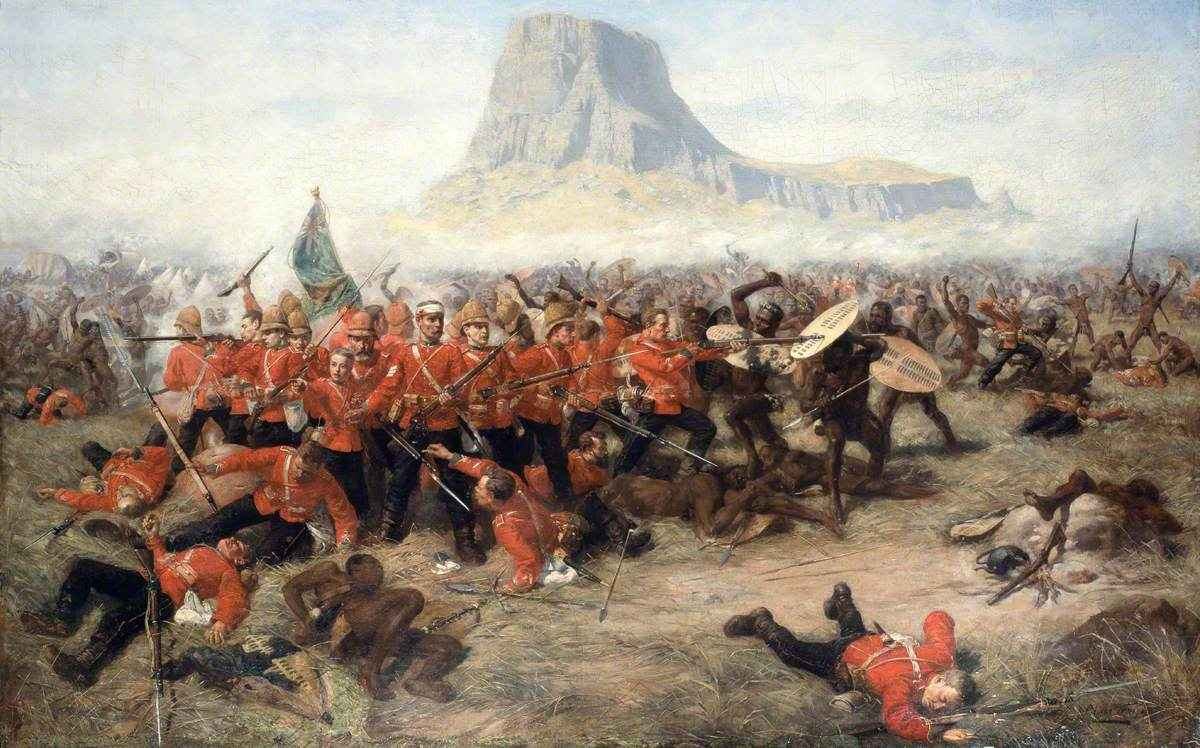
The Last Stand at Isandlwana, 1879, by Charles Edwin Fripp in 1885. Collection of the National Army Museum of South Africa

- Alfred Basel
- Roman Zenzinger

=== Belgian ===
==== First World War ====
- Alfred Bastien, 1873—1955

=== British ===
British participation in foreign wars has been the subject of paintings and other works created by Britain's war artists. Artwork like the 1688 painting,The Fleet at Sea by Willem van de Velde the Younger depict the Royal Navy in readiness for battle. The Ministry of Defence art collection includes many paintings showing battle scenes, particularly naval battles. Military art and portraiture has evolved along with other aspects of war. The British official war artists of the First World War created a unique account of that conflict. The British War Artists Scheme expanded the number of official artists and enlarged the scope of their activities during the Second War.

Significant themes in the chronicle of twentieth-century wars have been developed by non-military, non-official, civilian artists. For example, society portraitist Arabella Dorman's paintings of wounded Iraq War veterans inspired her to spend two weeks with three regiments in different frontline areas: the Green Jackets at Basra Palace, the Queen's Own Gurkhas at Shaibah Logistics Base ten miles south-west of Basra, and the Queen's Royal Lancers in the Maysaan desert. In the field, Dorman drew quick charcoal portraits of the men she met. Returning to England, the sketches she made helped her use art to "evoke the emotions and psychological impact of war," rather than depicting the "physical horror" of war.

Selected artists
A select list of representative British artists includes:

==== Napoleonic Wars ====
- Denis Dighton, 1792–1827
- Robert Ker Porter, 1777–1842
- John Christian Schetky, 1778–1874

==== Crimean War ====
- Jerry Barrett, 1824–1906
- Oswald Brierly, 1817–1894
- William Simpson, 1823–1899

==== Boer Wars ====
- John Henry Frederick Bacon, 1868–1914
- René Bull, 1872–1942
- Charles Edwin Fripp, 1854–1906
- Godfrey Douglas Giles, 1857–1941
- Ernest Prater, 1864–1950
- Melton Prior, 1845–1910
- Frederic Villiers, 1851–1922
- William Barnes Wollen, 1857–1936

==== First World War ====
- Anna Airy, 1882–1964
- Muirhead Bone, 1888–1953
- Sydney Carline, 1888–1929
- Colin Gill, 1892–1940
- Eric Kennington RA, 1888–1960
- Wyndham Lewis, 1882–1957
- John Hodgson Lobley RA, 1878–1954
- John Edmund Mace, 1889–1952
- Olive Mudie-Cooke, 1890–1925
- John Nash CBE RA, 1893–1977
- Paul Nash, 1889–1946
- C.R.W. Nevinson, 1889–1946
- Sir William Orpen KBE RA RHA, 1878–1931
- Sir Stanley Spencer RA, 1891–1959

==== Second World War ====
- George Worsley Adamson RE, 1913–2005
- Edward Ardizzone CBE RA, 1900–1979
- Richard Eurich RA, 1903–1992
- Edward Bawden RA, 1903–1989
- Henry Carr RA, 1894–1970
- Jack Bridger Chalker, 1918–2014
- Leslie Cole, 1910–1976
- Charles Cundall, 1890–1971
- Amy Elton, 1904-1989 (working for the Department of External Affairs in India, 1942–1945)
- Reginald Eves, 1876–1941
- Anthony Gross, 1905-1984
- Bernard Hailstone, 1910–1987
- Thomas Hennell, 1903–1945
- Eliot Hodgkin, 1905–1987
- Ley Kenyon, 1913-1990
- Laura Knight DBE RA, 1877–1970
- (Thomas) John Mansbridge, 1901–1981
- Philip Meninsky, 1919–2007.
- John Mennie, 1911–1982
- James Morris, 1908–1989
- Ashley George Old, 1913–2001
- Cuthbert Orde, 1888–1968
- John Piper, 1903–1992
- Roland Vivian Pitchforth, 1911–1999
- Eric Ravilious, 1903–1942
- Leo Rawlings, 1918-1990
- Albert Richards, 1919–1945
- Henry Rushbury KCVO RA, 1898–1968
- Stella Schmolle, 1908–1975
- Ronald Searle CBE RDI, 1920–2011
- Ruskin Spear RA, 1911–1990
- Sir Stanley Spencer RA, 1891–1959
- Graham Sutherland OM, 1903–1980
- Ernest Wallcousins, 1882–1976
- Carel Weight CBE RA, 1908–1997
- John Worsley, 1897–1991
- Doris Zinkeisen, 1919–2000

==== Recent conflicts ====
- Richard Johnson, b. 1966
- Derek Eland, b. 1961 (Afghanistan, 2011)
- Fergus Greer, b. 1961, Kosovo
- Peter Howson, b. 1958
- John Keane, b. 1954
- Linda Kitson, b. 1945 (Falklands, 1982)
- Xavier Pick, b. 1972 (Iraq with British and US Forces, 2009–2011)
- Steve Mumford, b. 1960 (Iraq with US Forces)
- Paul Seawright, b 1965 (Afghanistan) Imperial War Museum Commission
- Barry John (artist), b 1974 (Northern Ireland) with Royal Welsh

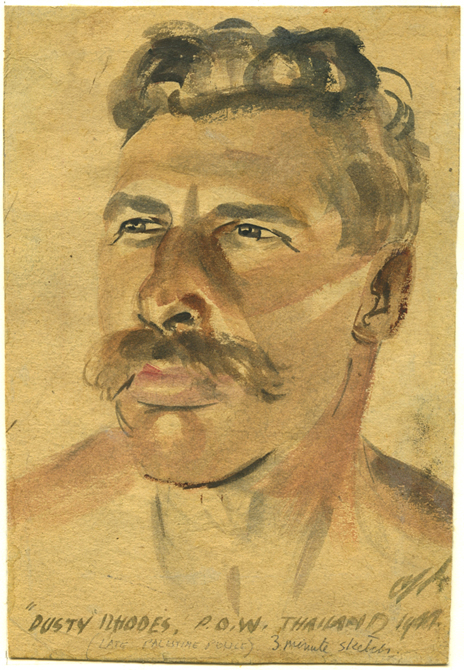
Portrait of POW "Dusty" Rhodes. A three-minute sketch by Ashley George Old painted in Thailand

=== Canadian ===
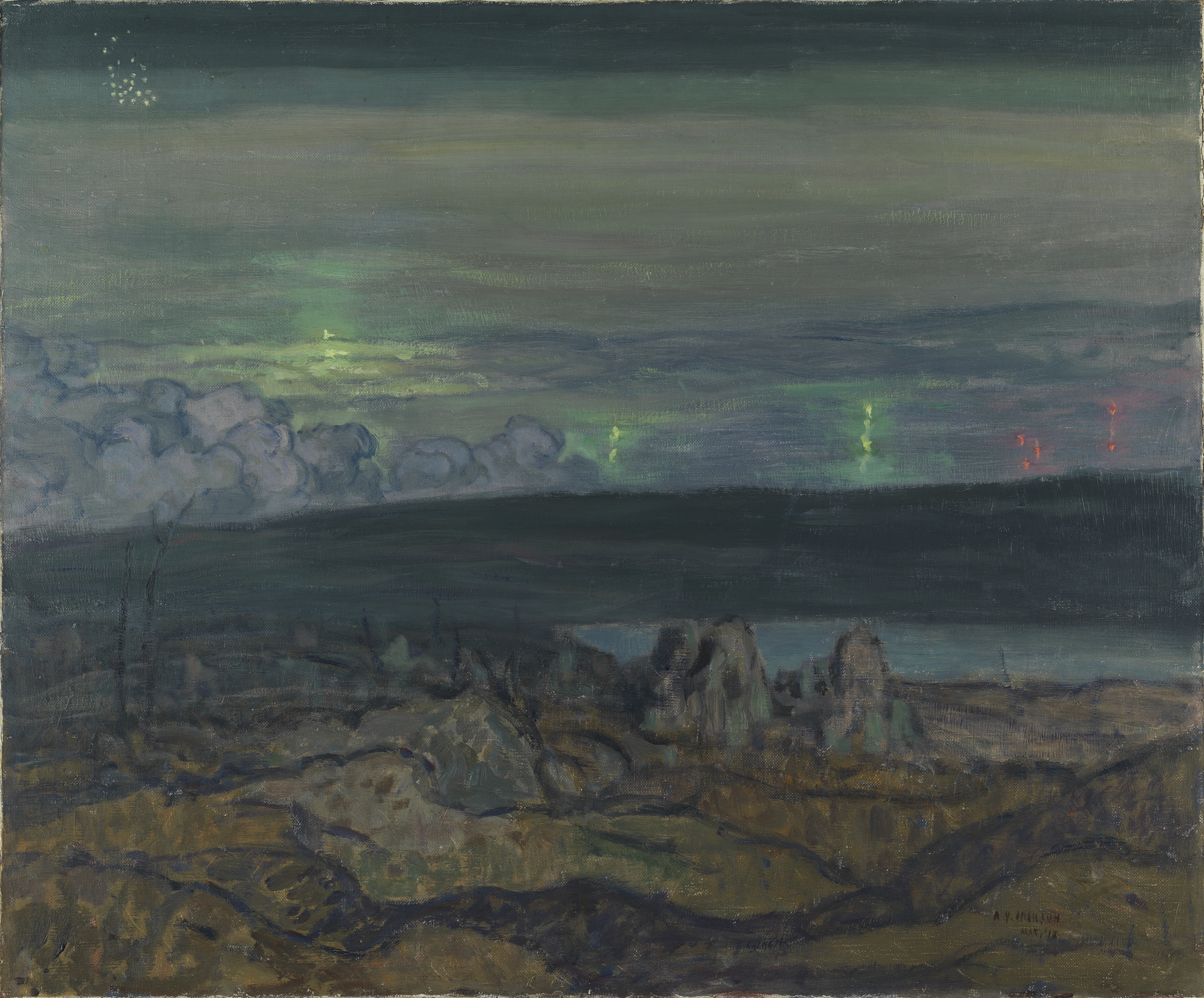
Canadian Forestry Corps' Gas Attack, Lievin (1918) by Canadian war artist A. Y. Jackson

Representative works by Canada's artists whose work illustrates and records war are gathered into the extensive collection of the Canadian War Museum. The earliest war art in Canada was rock art created by Indigenous peoples from all regions of the country. During the colonial period, large-scale, European-style paintings of war dominated New France and British North America. The First and Second World Wars saw a dramatic increase in the production of war art in every medium. A few First World War paintings were exhibited in the Senate of Canada Chamber, and artists studied these works as a way of preparing to create new artworks in the conflict in Europe which expanded after 1939.

"The war art commissions brought intense focus to the observation of Canada's role in international conflict... A driving need for a strong national identity urged First and Second World War artists toward symbolism. While these vivid images are of a now distant past, they continue to communicate their messages to us, and so never lose their relevance."

In the Second World War, Canada expanded its official art program; Canadian war artists were a kind of journalist who lived the lives of soldiers. The work of non-official civilian artists also became part of the record of this period. Canada supported Canadian official war artists in both the First World War and the Second World War; no official artists were designated during the Korean War.

Among Canada's embedded artist-journalist teams was Richard Johnson, who was sent by the National Post to Afghanistan in 2007 and 2011; his drawings of Canadian troops were published and posted online as part of the series "Kandahar Journal".

Prominent themes explored by Canadian war artists include commemoration, identity, women, Indigenous representation, propaganda, protest, violence, and religion.

Selected artists
A select list of representative Canadian artists includes:

==== First World War ====
- John William Beatty, 1869–1941
- Alexander Young Jackson CC CMG, 1882–1974
- Wyndham Lewis, 1882–1957
- Arthur Lismer CC, 1885–1969
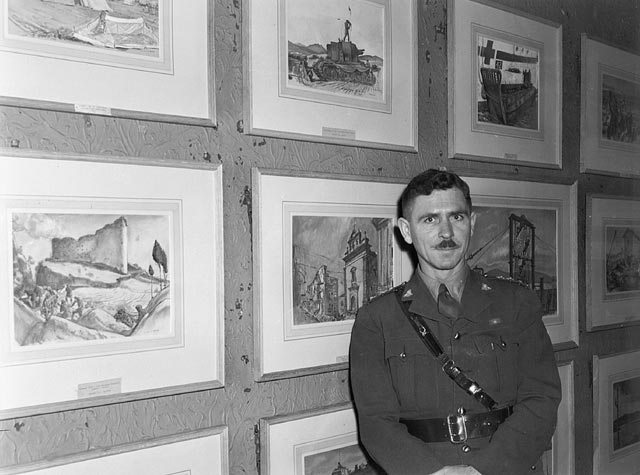
  Capt. Will Ogilvie, Official army war artist, with some of his paintings, 9 February 1944
- Frederick Varley, 1881–1969
- Mabel May, 1877-1971
- Marion Long, 1882–1970

==== Second World War ====
- Eric Aldwinckle, 1909-1980
- Donald Kenneth Anderson, 1920–2009
- Harold Beament, 1898–1985
- Alan Brockman Beddoe OC OBE HFHS FHSC, 1893–1975
- Molly Lamb Bobak CM ONB, 1922–2014
- Paraskeva Clark, 1898-1986
- David Alexander Colville PC CC ONS, 1920–2013
- Charles Fraser Comfort OC, 1900–1994
- Charles Goldhamer, 1903–1985
- Paul Goranson, 1911–2002
- Lawren P. Harris, 1910–1994
- William Abernethy Ogilvie CM MBE, 1901–1989
- George Campbell Tinning RCA, 1910-1996
- Jack Shadbolt OC OBC, 1909–1998

==== Recent conflicts ====
- Richard Johnson, b. 1966
- Edward Zuber, 1932–2018

=== Chilean ===
- Nicolás Guzmán Bustamante, 1850–1928, chiefly painting the War of the Pacific and the Conquest of Chile

=== Chinese ===
- Li Hua
- Feng Zikai

=== Dutch ===
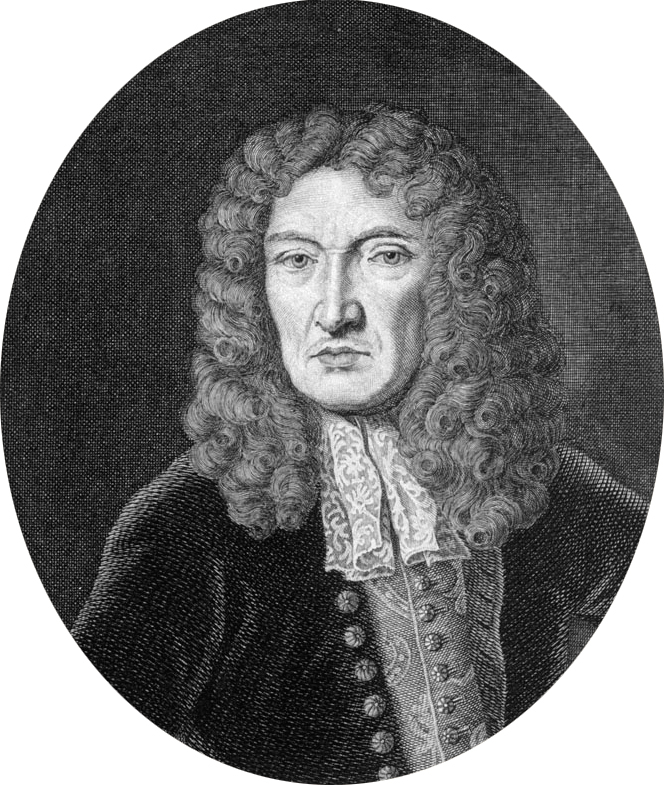
Willem van de Velde the Elder (c. 1611–1693) was the official naval war artist of the Dutch Admiralties during the first two Anglo-Dutch Wars in the 17th century.

- Willem van de Velde the Elder
- Philips Wouwerman

=== Finnish ===
War artist Kari Suomalainen working on a drawing during the Continuation War.

==== World War II ====
- Kari Suomalainen, 1920–1999, Finland's most famous editorial cartoonist, worked as a war artist during World War II.

=== Flemish ===
- Vincent Adriaenssen
- Pieter van Bloemen
- Frans Breydel
- Karel Breydel
- Jasper Broers
- Laureys a Castro
- Nicolaas van Eyck
- Frans Geffels
- Robert van den Hoecke
- Lambert de Hondt the Elder
- Jan Baptist van der Meiren
- Adam Frans van der Meulen
- Pieter Meulener
- Arnold Frans Rubens
- Lucas Smout the Younger
- Peter Snayers
- Jan Snellinck
- Jan Peeter Verdussen
- Pieter Verdussen
- Sebastiaen Vrancx
- Cornelis de Wael

=== French ===
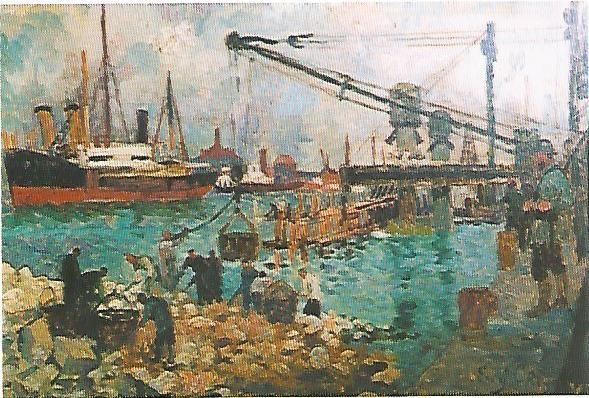
Eugène Chigot (1917), The rebuilding of partially destroyed Calais docks during the Great War.

French war art poster by Henri Dangon, 1916. Lithograph by Imp. H. Chachoin, Paris

During the First World War, the work of artists depicting aspects of the military conflict were put on display in official war art exhibitions. In 1916 the Ministry of Beaux-Arts and the Ministry of War sponsored the Salon des Armées to show the work of the artists who had been mobilized. This one exhibition realized 60,000 francs. The proceeds supported needy artists at home and the disabled.

- Hippolyte Bellangé
- Nicolas Toussaint Charlet
- Eugène Chigot
- Edouard Detaille
- Antoine-Jean Gros
- Constantin Guys
- Eugène Louis Lami
- Louis-François, Baron Lejeune
- Jean-Louis-Ernest Meissonier
- Alphonse-Marie de Neuville
- Paul Philippoteaux
- Paul Alexandre Protais
- Denis Auguste Marie Raffet
- Carle Vernet
- Horace Vernet
- Antoine Watteau
- Adolphe Yvon

=== German ===
- Emmanuel Leutze
- Adolph Menzel

==== Franco-Prussian War ====
- Georg Bleibtreu
- Wilhelm Camphausen
- Emil Hünten
- Carl Röchling
- Anton von Werner

==== First World War ====
- Luitpold Adam
- Otto Dix
- Theodor Rocholl

==== Second World War ====
- Luitpold Adam
- Heinrich Amersdorffer
- Alfred Hierl
- Conrad Hommel
- Hans Liska

==== Recent conflicts ====
- Frauke Eigen, b. 1969

=== Japanese ===
- Kubota Beisen, 1852–1906
- Toyohara Chikanobu, 1838–1912
- Tsuguharu Foujita, 1886–1968
- Ogata Gekkō, 1859–1920
- Toshihide Migita, 1862–1925
- Utagawa Yoshiiku, 1833–1904

=== Korean ===
- Kim Seong-hwan, 1932–2019

=== New Zealand ===
War artists have been appointed by the government to supplement the record of New Zealand's military history. The title of "war artist" changed to "army artist" when Ion Brown was appointed after the two world wars.

Conservators at the National Art Gallery considered the collection to be of historic rather than artistic worth; few were displayed. New Zealand's National Collection of War Art encompasses the work of artists who were working on commission for the Government as official war artists, while others created artworks for their own reasons.

Selected artists
A select list of representative New Zealand artists includes:

==== First World War ====
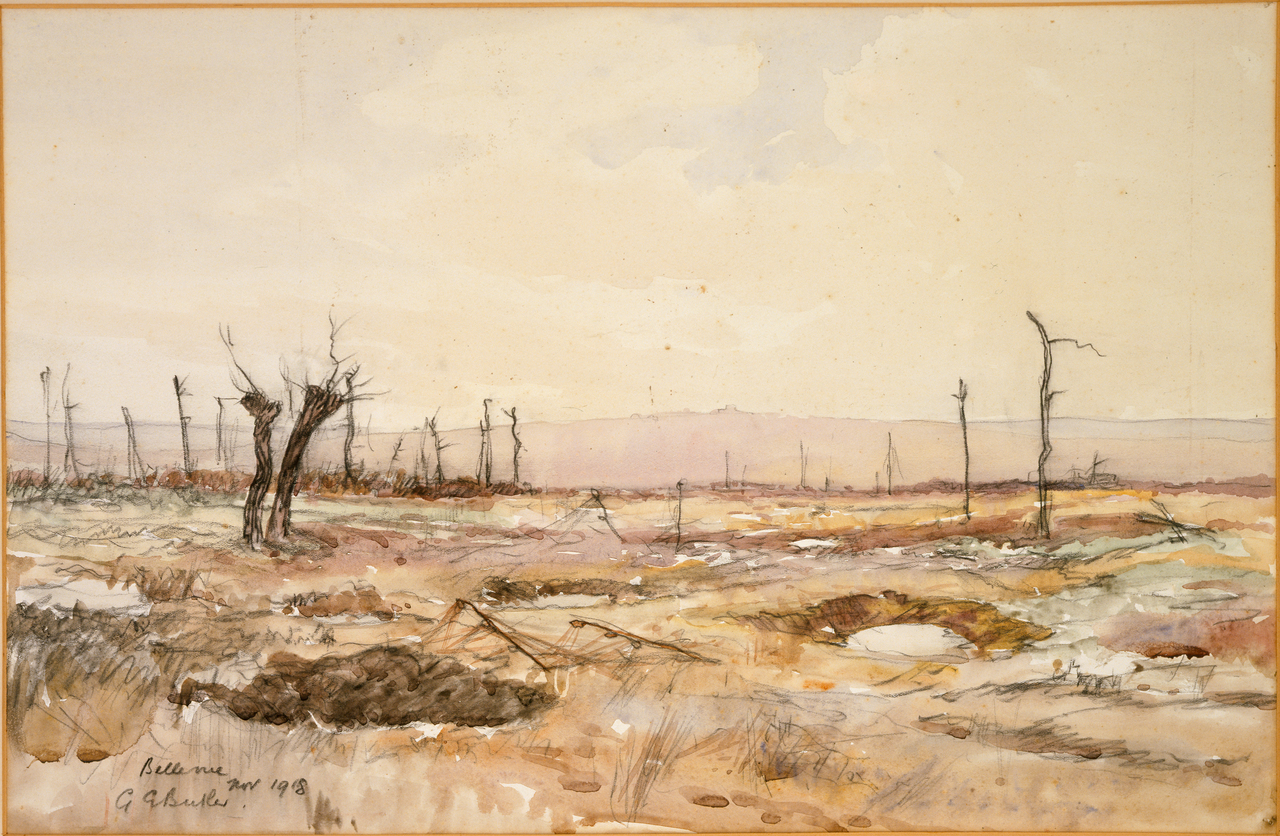
Bellevue Ridge, 1918 by New Zealand official war artist George Edmund Butler

- George Edmund Butler
- Horace Moore-Jones
- Nugent Herrmann Welch

==== Second World War ====
- James Boswell, 1906–1971
- Russell Clark, 1905–1966
- John McIndoe, 1898–1995
- Peter McIntyre OBE, 1910–1995

==== Recent conflicts ====
- Ion Brown, Bosnia and Croatia
- Matthew Gauldie, Solomon Islands and Afghanistan

=== Romanian ===
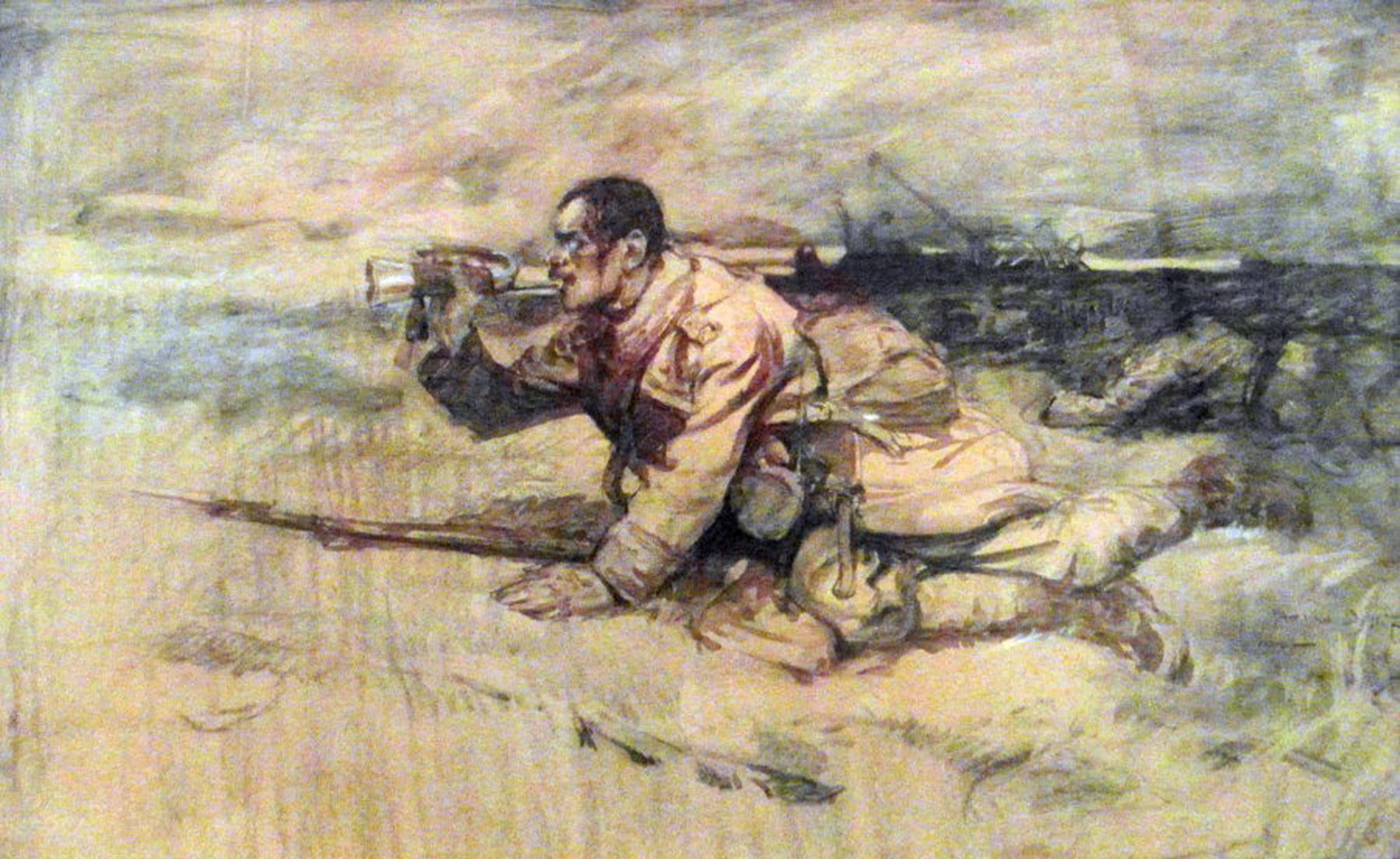
The Last Attack of the Wounded Bugler by Ion Stoica Dumitrescu, 1917

- Ion Stoica Dumitrescu
- Nicolae Grigorescu
- Carol Szathmari

=== Russian ===
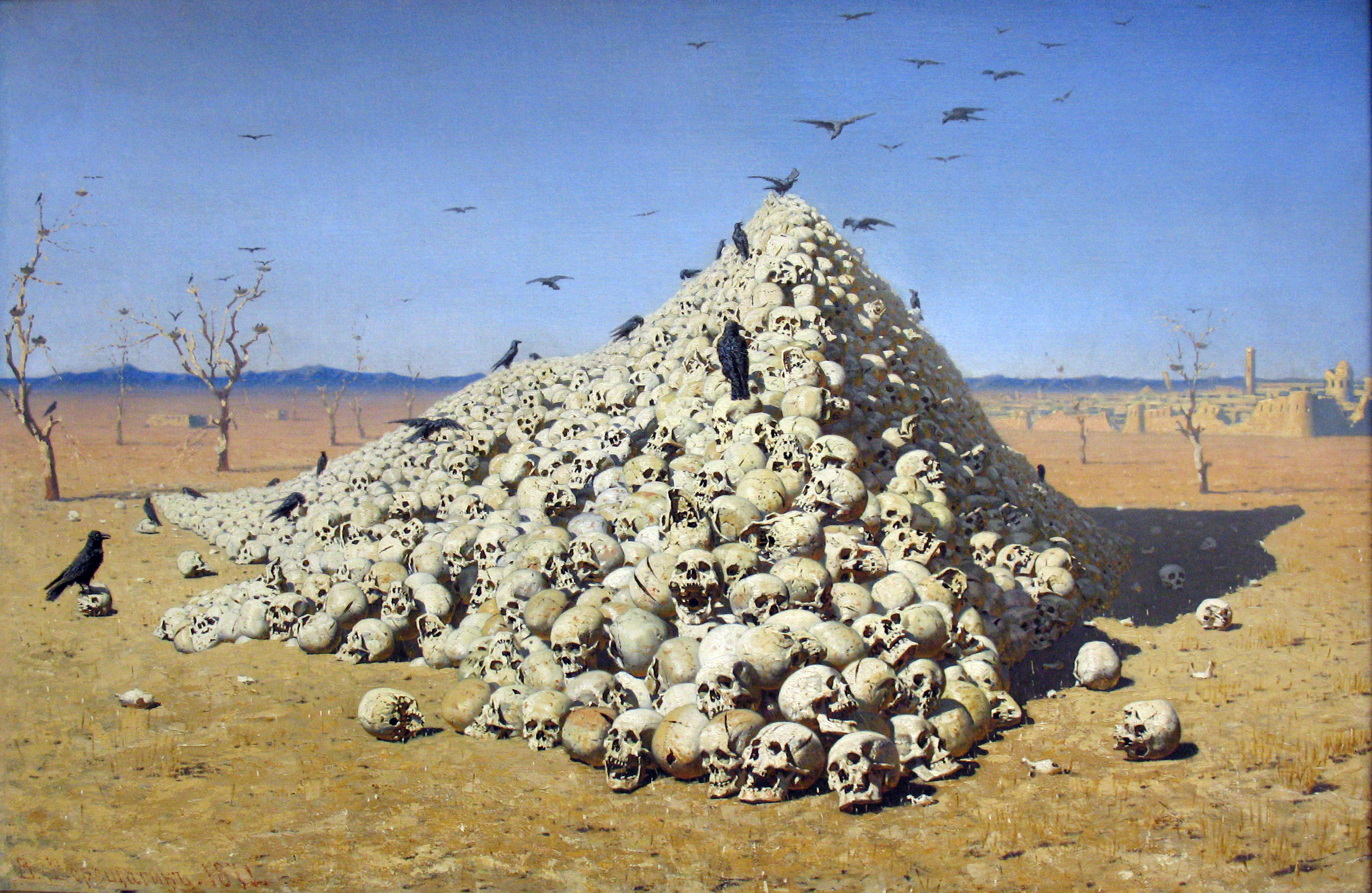
The Apotheosis of War by Vasily Vereshchagin, 1871

- Mikhail Avilov
- Nikolai Baskakov
- Lev Chegorovsky
- Vladimir Chekalov
- Aleksandr Deyneka
- Nikolai Dmitriev-Orenburgsky
- Rudolf Frentz
- Nikolay Karazin
- Aleksey Kivshenko
- Victor Korovin
- Alexander Kotzebue
- Lev Lagorio
- Viktor Poltavets
- Franz Roubaud
- Nikolai Samokish
- Alexander Sauerweid
- Nikolay Sauerweid
- Vasily Vereshchagin
- Bogdan Willewalde

=== Serbian ===
- Mihailo Milovanović, 1879–1941, one of the most distinguished artists in World War I
- Veljko Stanojević, 1892–1967
- Kosta Miličević, 1877–1920
- Živorad Nastasijević, 1895–1966
- Nadežda Petrović, 1873–1915, succumbed to typhus fever in 1915
- Natalija Cvetković, 1888–1928
- Beta Vukanović, 1872–1972
- Rista Vukanović, 1873–1918, the husband Beta Vukanović
- Miodrag Petrović, 1888–1950
- Todor Švrakić, 1882–1931
- Vladimir Becić, 1886–1954
- Ana Marinković, 1881–1973

=== South African ===
- Neville Lewis (World War II)

=== Spanish ===
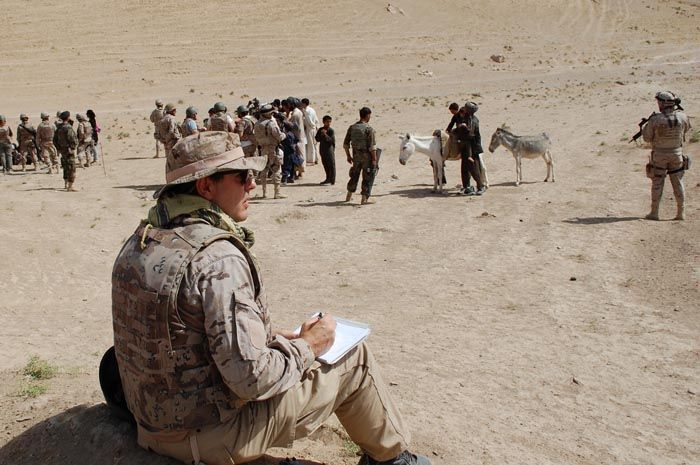
Spanish war artist Augusto Ferrer-Dalmau in Afghanistan (2012)

- Francisco de Goya, e.g., The Disasters of War, The Third of May 1808, 1810s
- Pablo Picasso, Guernica, 1937.
- Augusto Ferrer-Dalmau 1964

=== United States ===
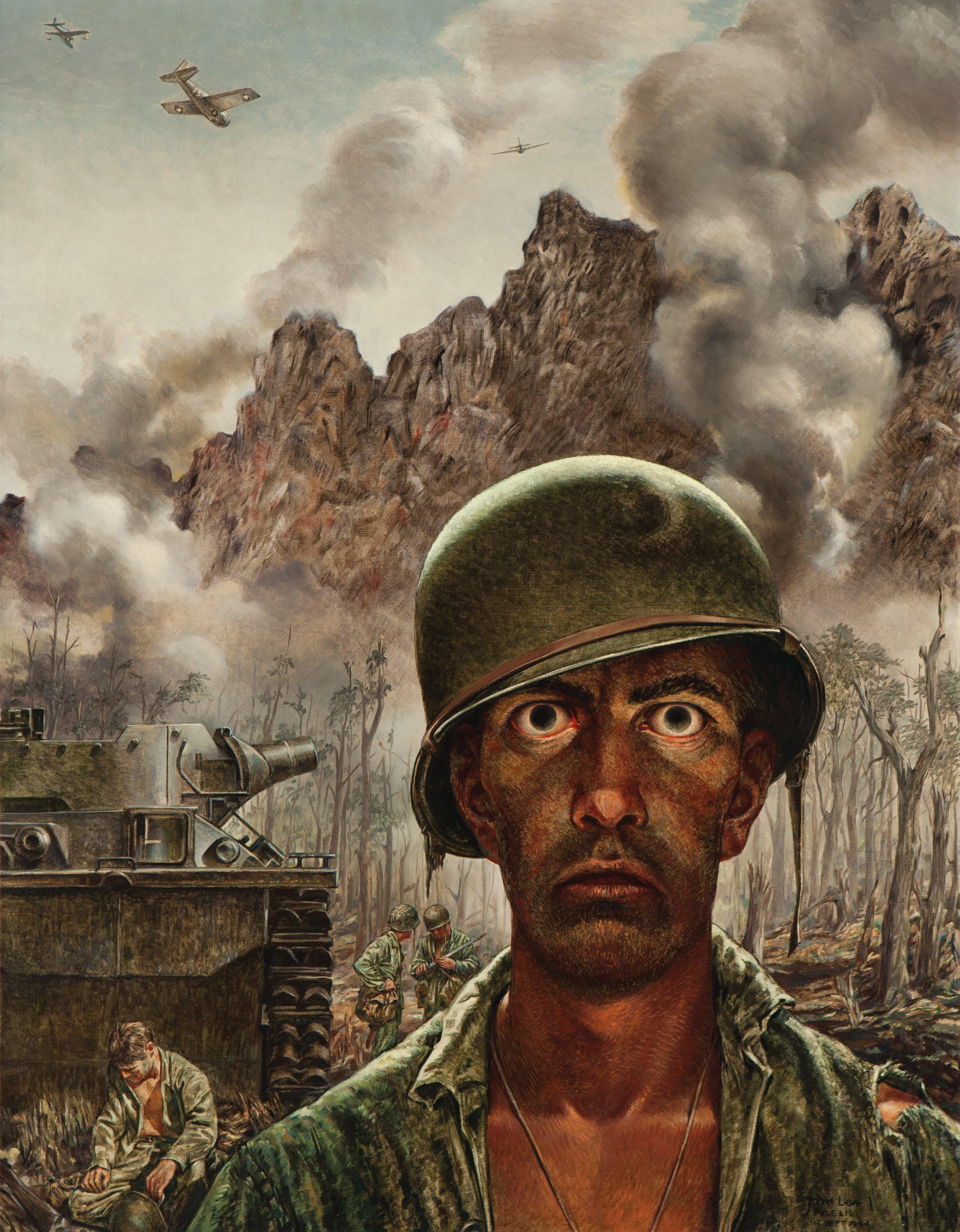
Thomas Lea's The 2000 Yard Stare published in 1945

The American panorama created by artists whose work focuses on war began with a visual account of the American Revolutionary War. The war artist or combat artist captures instantaneous action and conflates earlier moments of the same scene within one compelling image. Artists are unlike the objective camera lens, which records only a single instant and no more.

In 1917 the American military designated American official war artists who were sent to Europe to record the activities of the American Expeditionary Forces.

In World War II, the Navy Combat Art Program ensured that active-duty artists developed a record of all phases of the war and all major naval operations.

The official war artist continued to be supported in some military engagements. Teams of soldier-artists during the Vietnam War created pictorial accounts and interpretations for the annals of army military history. In 1992 the Army Staff Artist Program was attached to the United States Army Center of Military History as a permanent part of the Museum Division's Collections Branch.

Michael Fay is an official US Marine war artist, one of only three whose work depicts the battlefronts in Iraq and Afghanistan (2007).

The majority of combat artists of the 1970s were selected by George Gray, chairman of NACAL, Navy Air Cooperation and Liaison committee. Some of their paintings will be selected for the Navy Combat Art Museum in the capital by Charles Lawrence, director. In January 1978 the U.S. Navy chose a seascape specialist team: they asked Patricia Yaps and Wayne Dean, both of Milford, Connecticut, to capture air-sea rescue missions off of Key West while they were based at the nearby Naval Air Station Key West. They were among 78 artists selected that year to create works of art depicting Navy subjects.

Selected artists
A select list of representative American artists includes:

==== Revolutionary War ====
- Ralph Earl
- John Trumbull

==== American Civil War ====
- Alonzo Chappel
- Edwin Forbes
- Gilbert Gaul
- Winslow Homer
- Thomas Nast
- Julian Scott
- Xanthus Russell Smith
- Alfred Waud
- William Waud

==== Spanish–American War ====
- Howard Chandler Christy Newspaper
- William Glackens Newspaper
- Henry Reuterdahl Newspaper
- Walter Russell Newspaper

==== World War I ====
- William James Aylward
- Walter Jack Duncan
- Harvey Thomas Dunn
- Kerr Eby Marines
- George Matthews Harding
- Wallace Morgan
- Louis Orr
- Ernest Clifford Peixotto
- John Singer Sargent
- J. Andre Smith
- Henry Tonks
- Harry Everett Townsend, Army
- Claggett Wilson Army

==== World War II ====
- Tore Asplund, 1903–1977
- Standish Backus, 1910–1989
- McClelland Barclay, 1891–1942
- George Biddle, 1885–1973
- Aaron Bohrod, 1907–1992
- Howard Brodie, 1915–2010
- Manuel Bromberg, 1917–
- Jack Coggins, 1914–2006
- Raymond Creekmore, 1905–1984
- John Steuart Curry, 1897–1946
- Olin Dows, 1904-1981
- Edward Dugmore, 1915–1996
- William Franklin Draper, 1912–2003
- Harry Jackson, 1924–2011
- Mitchell Jamieson, 1915–1976
- Joe Jones, 1909–1963
- Yasuo Kuniyoshi, 1893–1953
- Thomas Lea, 1907–2001
- Ludwig Mactarian, 1908–1955
- John McDermott, 1919–1977
- John Cullen Murphy, 1919–2004
- Albert K. Murray, 1906–1992
- Henry Varnum Poor, 1887–1970
- Henry Rushbury, 1889–1968
- Dwight Shepler, 1905–1974
- Mitchell Siporin, 1910–1976
- Sidney Simon, 1917-1997 aka. Sid Simon,
- Sam Smith, 1918-1999
- Taro Yashima, 1908-1994
- Yasuo Kuniyoshi, 1889–1953

==== Vietnam era ====
Soldier Artist Participants in the U. S. Army Vietnam Combat Artists Program

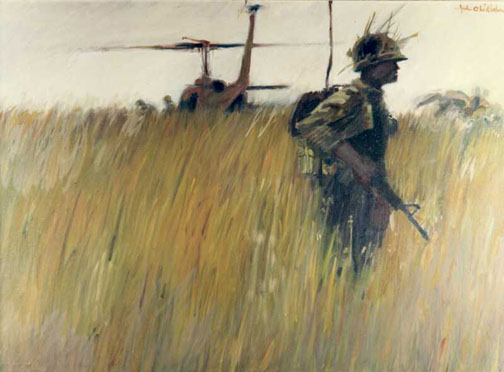
Landing Zone by John O. Wehrle, CAT I, 1966, Courtesy of the National Museum of the United States Army

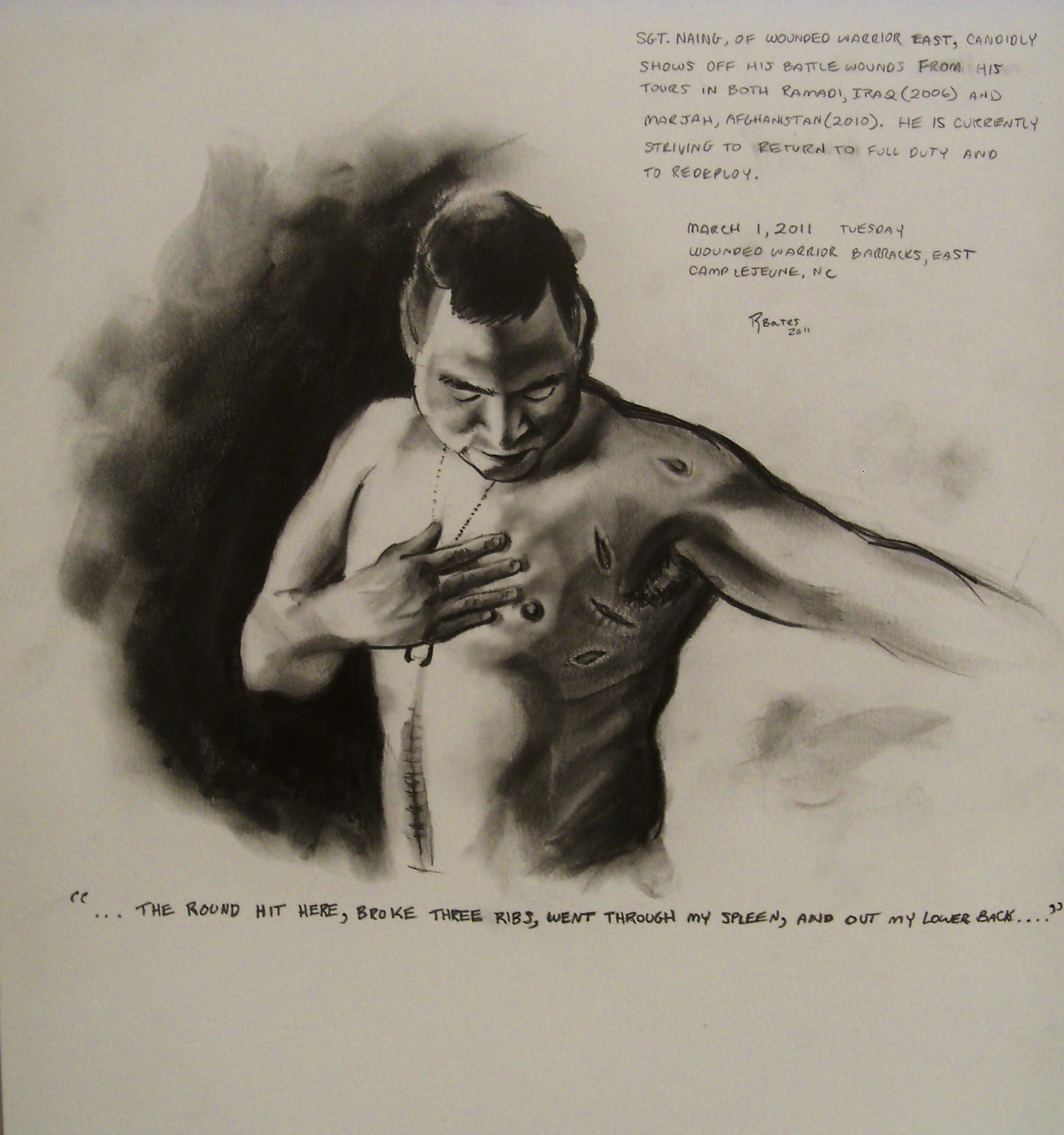
Sergeant Than Naing of Wounded Warrior Battalion, East, sketched by Robert William Bates, 2011

- CAT I, 15 Aug – 15 Dec 1966, Roger A. Blum (Stillwell, KS), Robert C. Knight (Newark, NJ), Ronald E. Pepin (East Hartford, CT), Paul Rickert (Philadelphia, PA), Felix R. Sanchez (Fort Madison, IA), John O. Wehrle (Dallas, TX), and supervisor, Frank M. Sherman
- CAT II, 15 Oct 1966 – 15 Feb 1967, Augustine G. Acuna (Monterey, CA), Alexander A. Bogdanovich (Chicago, IL), Theodore E. Drendel (Naperville, IL), David M. Lavender (Houston, TX), Gary W. Porter (El Cajon, CA), and supervisor, Carolyn M. O'Brien
- CAT III, 16 Feb – 17 June 1967, Michael R. Crook (Sierra Madre, CA), Dennis O. McGee (Castro Valley, CA), Robert T. Myers (White Sands Missile Range, NM), Kenneth J. Scowcroft (Manassas, VA), Stephen H. Sheldon (Los Angeles, CA), and supervisor, C. Bruce Smyser
- CAT IV, 15 Aug – 31 Dec 1967, Samuel E. Alexander (Philadelphia, MS), Daniel T. Lopez (Fresno, CA), Burdell Moody (Mesa, AZ), James R. Pollock (Pollock, SD), Ronald A. Wilson (Alhambra, CA), and technical supervisor, Frank M. Thomas
- CAT V, 1 Nov 1967 – 15 March 1968, Warren W. Buchanan (Kansas City, MO), Philip V. Garner (Dearborn, MI), Phillip W. Jones (Greensboro, NC), Don R. Schol (Denton, TX), John R. Strong (Kanehoe, HI), and technical supervisor, Frank M. Thomas
- CAT VI, 1 Feb – 15 June 1968, Robert T. Coleman (Grand Rapids, MI), David N. Fairrington (Oakland, CA), John D. Kurtz IV (Wilmington, DE), Kenneth T. McDaniel (Paris, TN), Michael P. Pala (Bridgeport, CT)
- CAT VII, 15 Aug – 31 Dec 1968, Brian H. Clark (Huntington, NY), William E. Flaherty Jr. (Louisville, KY), William C. Harrington (Terre Haute, IN), Barry W. Johnston (Huntsville, AL), Stephen H. Randall (Des Moines, IA), and supervisor, Fitzallen N. Yow
- CAT VIII, 1 Feb – 15 June 1969, Edward J. Bowen (Carona Del Mar, CA), James R. Drake (Colorado Springs, CO), Roman Rakowsky (Cleveland, OH), Victory V. Reynolds (Idaho Falls, ID), Thomas B. Schubert (Chicago, IL), and supervisor, Fred B. Engel
- CAT IX, 1 Sept 1969 – 14 Jan 1970, David E. Graves (Lawrence, KS), James S. Hardy (Coronado, CA), William R. Hoettels (San Antonio, TX), Bruce N. Rigby (Dekalb, IL), Craig L. Stewart (Laurel, MD), and supervisor, Edward C. Williams

==== Recent conflicts ====
- Kristopher Battles, Iraq and Afghanistan
- Henry Casselli
- Michael D. Fay, Iraq and Afghanistan
- Victor Juhasz, Afghanistan

== See also ==
- War photography
- Commission (art)
  - American official war artists
  - Australian official war artists
  - British official war artists
  - Canadian official war artists
  - German official war artists
  - Japanese official war artists
  - New Zealand official war artists
