= List of German official war artists =

German official war artists were commissioned by the military to create artwork in the context of a specific war.

Official war artists have been appointed by governments for information or propaganda purposes and to record events on the battlefield; but there are many other types of artists depicting the subject or events of war. Meanwhile, military service and wartime experiences can significantly influence an artist's body of work. Artists like Ernst Ludwig Kirchner, Otto Dix and Max Beckmann, who served in World War I, saw their art profoundly affected by their frontline experiences, reflecting the harsh realities and emotional impacts of conflict in their subsequent works.

== First World War ==
The German military supported soldier-artists during this conflict.

- Luitpold Adam
- Albert Reich

== Second World War ==
After 1939, Luitpold Adam was the head of the German military's Division of Visual Arts, which would expand to include 80 soldier-artists.

- Luitpold Adam
- Herbert Agricola
- Heinrich Amersdorffer
- Elk Eber
- Fritz Erler
- Franz Eichhorst
- Rudolf Hergstenberg
- Conrad Hommel
- Alfred Hierl
- Ernst Krause
- Emile Scheibe

== See also ==
- War artist
- Military art
- War photography
