= Breydel =

Breydel is a Flemish surname.

People with the name include:

- Frans Breydel (1679–1750), Flemish painter
- Jan Breydel (c. 1264–c. 1330), Flemish rebel leader
- Karel Breydel (1678–1733), Flemish painter
