= Zenzinger =

Zenzinger is a surname. Notable people with the surname include:

- Rachel Zenzinger, American politician
- Roman Zenzinger (1903–1990), Austrian artist and commercial designer
