= Hierl =

Hierl is a surname. Notable people with this surname include:

- Alfred Hierl (1910–1950), German artist
- Konstantin Hierl (1875–1955), German politician
- Susanne Hierl (born 1973), German politician
