= Luitpold Adam =

German painter

Luitpold Adam (1888–1950) was a German painter.

Adam was an official war artist during the First World War; and he was chosen by Adolf Hitler to be the head of the Nazi war artist program in the Second World War. In 1944, the number of war artists working under him numbered 80.

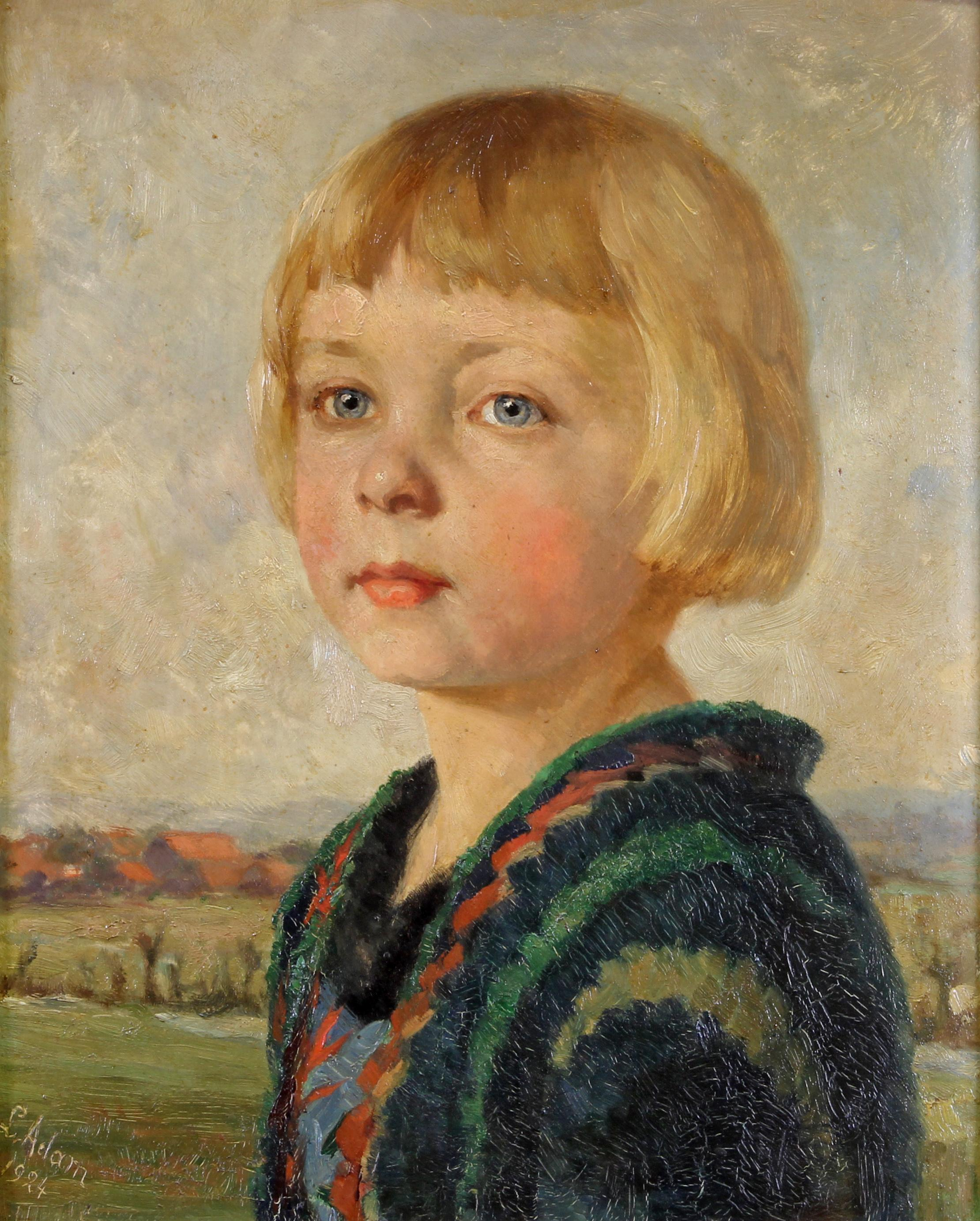
"Mädchen vor Weserlandschaft" by Luitpold Adam (1924)

== See also ==
- War artist
- List of German painters
