= Richard Johnson (war artist) =

Canadian journalist and war artist

- Corporal Alexandre Lanoix on patrol

Richard Johnson (born 1966 in Scotland) is a Canadian journalist and war artist.

== Early life and education ==
Johnson was born in Falkirk, Scotland, and was educated at Duncan of Jordanstone College of Art and Design. He was taught to draw by his grandfather, Herbert William Bingham, an amateur artist.

== Career ==
In 2003 Johnson, on assignment for the Detroit Free Press, embedded with the United States Marine Corps for the invasion and early months of the Iraq War. Much of Johnson’s artwork from that war is now held by the National Museum of the Marine Corps in Virginia. The artwork was part of a newspaper series with reporter Jeff Seidel. The writings and pencil sketches were compiled into a book, “Portraits of War,” in 2003.

In 2007, Johnson – writing and drawing for the National Post - traveled with a Canadian International Security Assistance Force in Kandahar, Afghanistan. Much of that work is now held by the Smithsonian Institution's National Museum of American History, in Washington, D.C.

In 2008 and 2009, Johnson traveled as photographer and videographer to Zimbabwe, the Democratic Republic of the Congo and the Central African Republic, while working for the United Nations.

In 2011, Johnson traveled with Canadian military in Kandahar, Afghanistan. Much of that work is now held by the Smithsonian National Museum of American History, in Washington, D.C.

In August 2012, Johnson returned to Afghanistan, to observe the US Army ISAF soldiers who took over from Canadian troops in Kandahar, and to Kabul and Masar-e-sharif to observe training missions by Canadian ISAF.

In 2013, Johnson began working for The Washington Post as illustrator.

In March 2014, he began a journal of urban sketching called "Drawing D.C. Together."

In August 2014, Johnson returned again to Afghanistan, covering the drawdown of U.S. combat troops.

In November 2015, he traveled to Ukraine, as part of the Canadian Forces Artists Program, covering NATO training.
