= Henry Rushbury =

British artist

Sir Henry George Rushbury KCVO CBE RA (28 October 1889 – 5 July 1968) was an English painter and etcher.

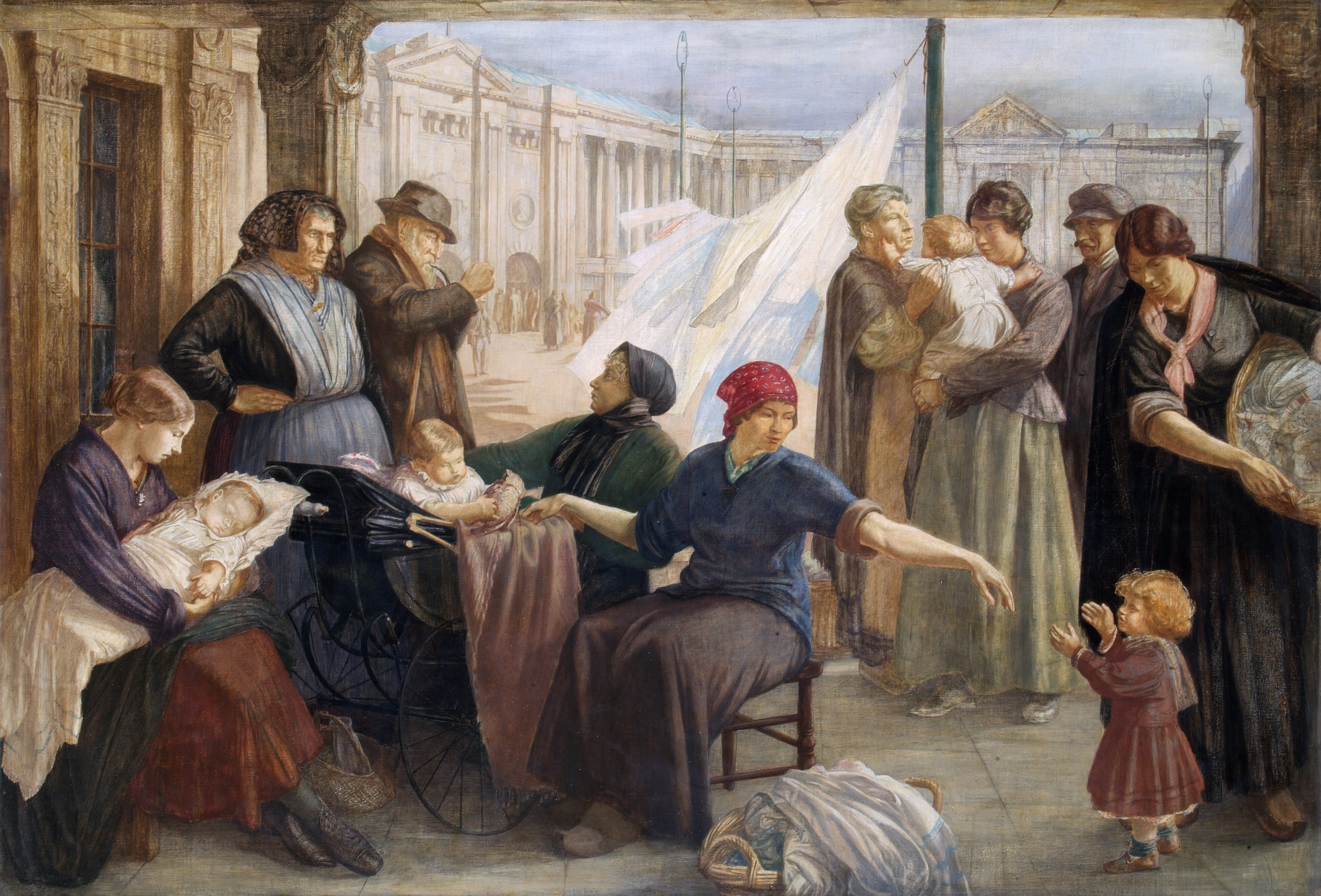
The War Refugees' Camp, Earl's Court (1918)

Born the son of a clerk in Harborne, then on the outskirts of Birmingham, Rushbury studied on a scholarship under Robert Catterson Smith at the Birmingham School of Art from the age of thirteen. He worked as an assistant to Henry Payne chiefly as a stained-glass artist, until 1912, when he moved to London, where he shared lodgings with fellow Birmingham student, Gerald Brockhurst.

Rushbury was an official war artist during World War I, and took up etching and drypoint under the influence of Francis Dodd before studying briefly under Henry Tonks at the Slade School of Art in 1921.

He was elected a member of the New English Art Club in 1917, the Royal Society of Painter-Etchers in 1921, the Royal Society of Painters in Water Colours in 1922, and the Royal Academy in 1936.

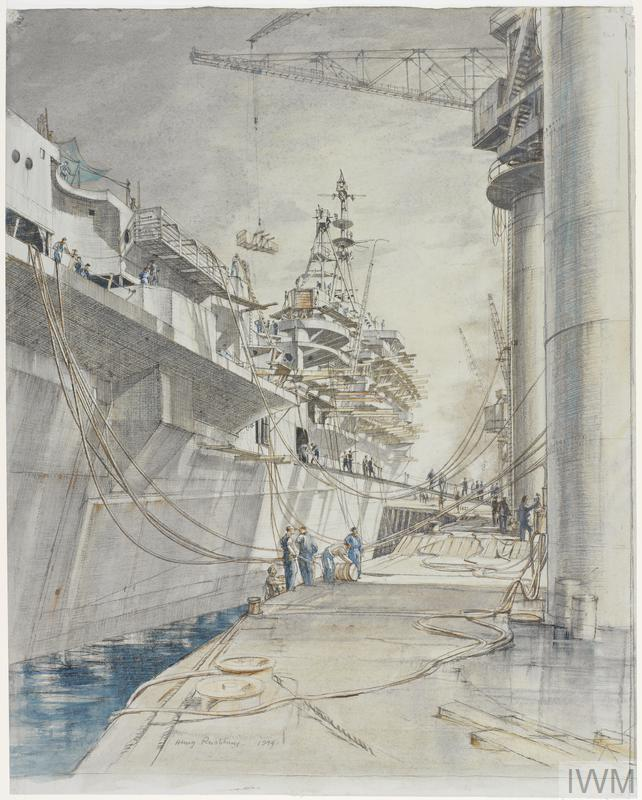
Shipbuilding, Glasgow (1944)

In 1940 he was again appointed an official war artist until 1945.

Around 1943 the owner of a Port Glasgow shipyard, James Lithgow, complained to the War Artists' Advisory Committee, WAAC, about Stanley Spencer's portrayal of his shipyard. WAAC duly commissioned Rushbury to go to Port Glasgow and produce some rather more conventional views of shipbuilding for Lithgow.

In 1949, he was elected Keeper of the Royal Academy and Head of the Royal Academy Schools, a post he held until 1964. He was appointed a Knight Commander of the Royal Victorian Order in the 1964 New Year Honours.

There is a memorial to Rushbury in St James's Church, Piccadilly, London.

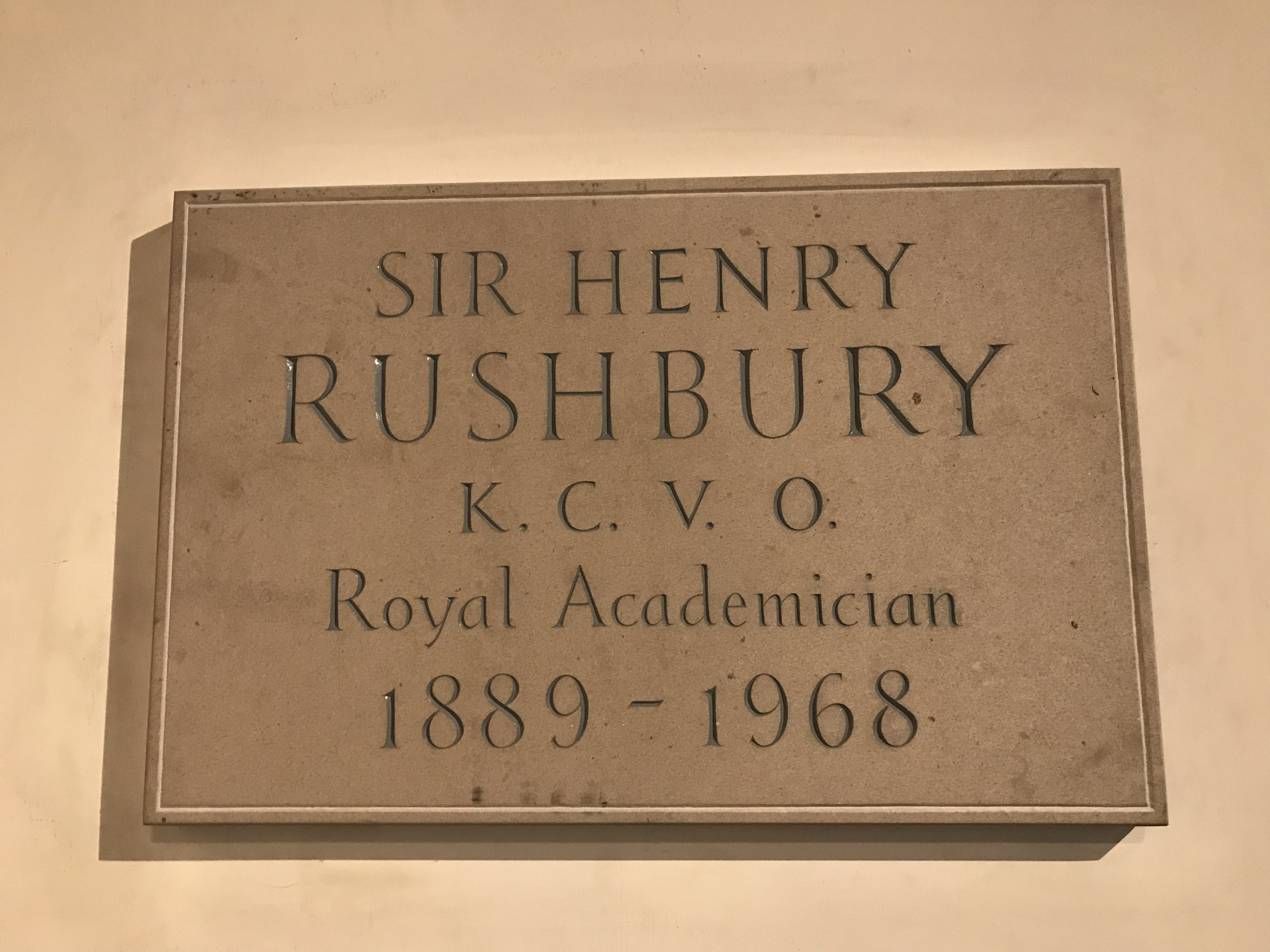
A memorial to Henry Rushbury in St James's Church, Piccadilly, London.
