= Arnold Frans Rubens =

Southern Netherlandish painter (1687–1719)

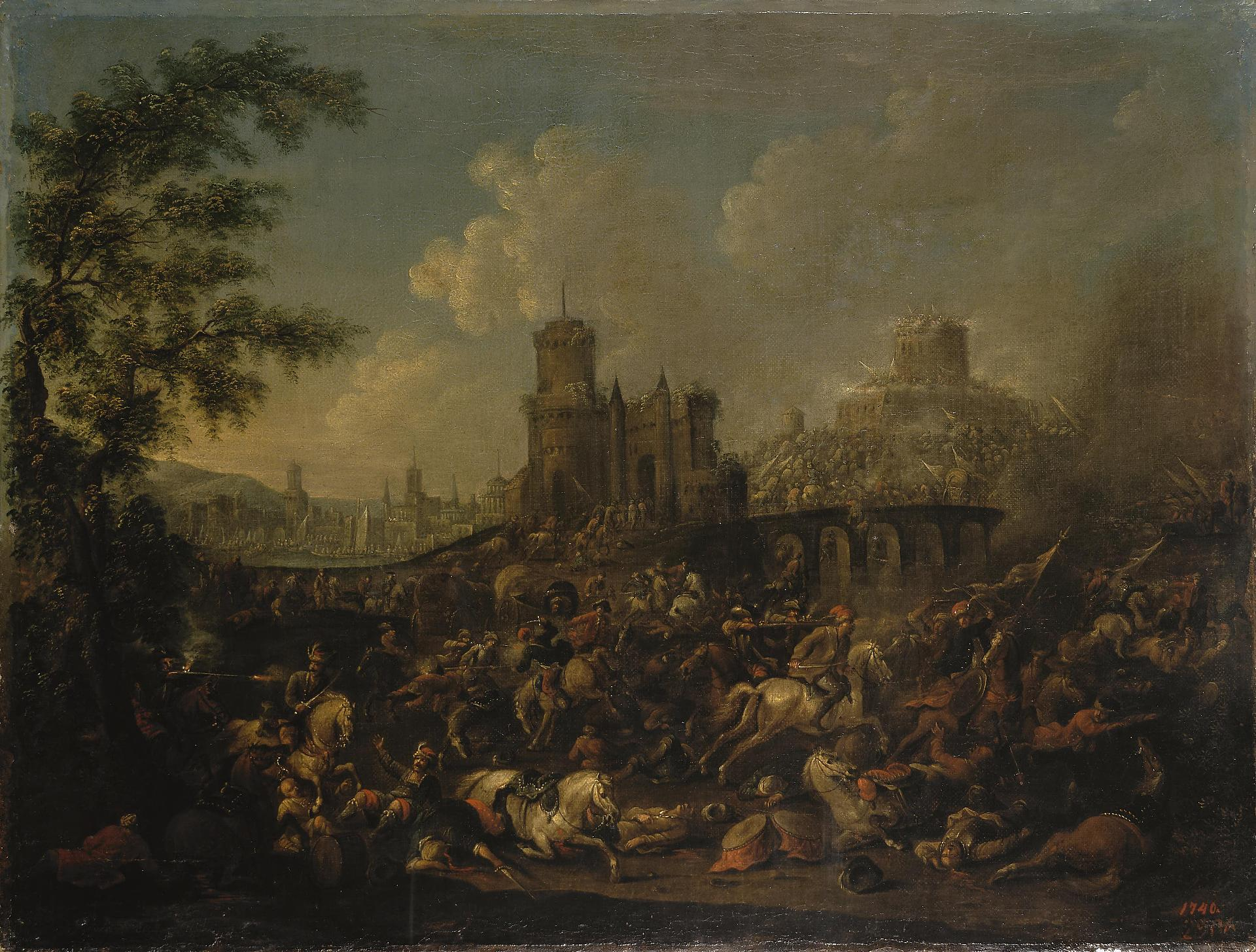
Battle between Turks and Poles

Arnold Frans (or Francesco) Rubens or Rubbens (1687–1719) was a Flemish Baroque painter who specialized in cabinet pictures of landscapes and battle scenes. He also painted some biblical subjects and genre scenes.

== Life ==
Rubens was born in Antwerp as the son of art dealer Arnold Rubbens and Catharina Pannens. Little is known about his life and training. He may have studied mainly on his own by copying paintings and prints that were available in his father's shop. He became a master in the Antwerp Guild of Saint Luke in 1715–1716.

He married in 1710 with Ursula Verbist. The couple had two daughters and three sons of whom one was called Peter Pauwel.

Jacob de Vil became his pupil in 1715–1716. The artist died young in Antwerp.

== Work ==
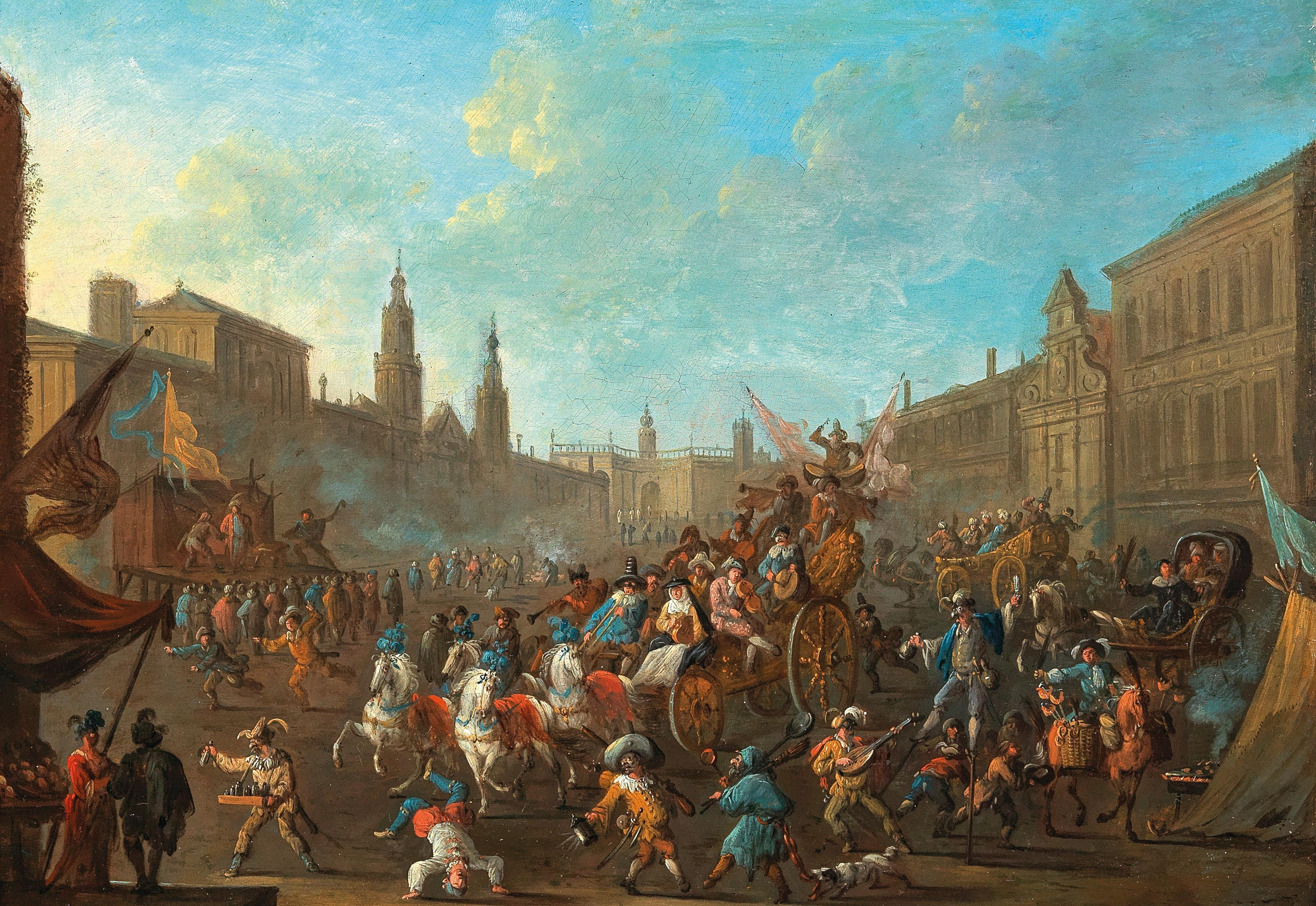
Carnival in an Italianate piazza

His work consists mainly of cabinet paintings that depict landscapes and battle scenes. Many of his landscapes are river landscapes or seascapes. The battles are often placed in antiquity or an oriental setting. He also copied paintings of his famous namesake Peter Paul Rubens to whom he is not believed to have been directly related.
He was influenced by the Antwerp painter Jan Baptist van der Meiren who was commercially successful with paintings depicting similar subjects. He also painted some biblical subjects and genre scenes.

In his biographies of Dutch painters published between 1729 and 1769, the Dutch biographer Jacob Campo Weyerman showed appreciation for Rubens' depiction of the faces of soldiers and palette. He was, however, negative about the manner in which Rubens painted horses and accused him even of copying prints by the German painter of battle scenes Georg Philipp Rugendas. In contrast, Weyerman was positive about the character of Rubens, whom he described as follows:

In the original Dutch version:

Vorders is dat Konstenaartje by uitnemendheit gedienstig
en vriendelyk voor een geboren Antwerpenaar, welke
Sinjoors doorgaans zo trots en onvriendelyk vallen tegens de
Vreemdelingen als zo veele opgeblaaze Lucifers, en klaarlyk
betoonen afkomstig te zyn van Duc d'Alba's Spaansche
Officieren en Krygsluiden …

In English translation:

In addition, that little artist is very obliging
and friendly for someone born in Antwerp whose
citizens are usually so proud and unfriendly to
foreigners like so many inflated Lucifers, and clearly
show they have descended from the Duke of Alva's Spanish
officers and soldiers ....

Works of Arnold Frans Rubens are in the collection of the Hermitage Museum.
