= Heinrich Amersdorffer =

German painter, printmaker, art teacher (1905–1986)

- Born: 10 December 1905
- Died: 2 December 1986 (aged 80)
- Occupations: painter, printmaker, war artist, art teacher

Heinrich Amersdorffer (10 December 1905 – 2 December 1986) was a German painter, printmaker, war artist and art teacher.

== Life ==
Amersdorffer was a son of Alexander Amersdorffer (1875–1946), the successor to art historian Ludwig Justi as director of the Prussian Academy of Arts.

During the 1930s he exhibited a number of times in the National Socialist Große Deutsche Kunstausstellung (Great German art exhibition) at Munich. During the Second World War he worked as a war artist on behalf of the Wehrmacht, covering the western campaign and the invasion of France, including the depiction of undamaged French cathedrals amidst the ruins of bombed cities, which was used to propagate the claim that German forces gave "magnanimous protection to architectural cultural heritage". His cycles of war art made his name within the Third Reich, especially a painting of Rouen Cathedral, exhibited in 1941. In January 1942 Amersdorffer said in the magazine Art for All: "It has been granted to me to be able to work on this great task on behalf of the armed forces".

In the postwar period Amersdorffer was appointed to a teaching position at the Academy of Arts, Berlin, and later became an honorary professor.

In 1976 he gave his collection of about 1,000 ancient Greek and Roman coins to the Berlin Antiquities Collection. A chief condition of the donation was that it would forever remain a part of the collection of antiquities, and consequently, could not become part of the Berlin Coin Cabinet.

== Bibliography ==
- Dorffer, Heinrich Bunting: Japanese Woodblock Prints from the Henry Amersdorffer collection, Berlin, 1963
- Heinrich Amersdorffer 70th anniversary exhibition, including oil paintings, watercolors, drawings, etchings. Rathaus Galerie, Wittenau, Berlin, 1976
- Ancient coins from the Amersdorffer collection of the National Museum's cultural heritage of Prussia pp. 28,29, Mann Verlag, Berlin, 1976. (illustrated issue) ISBN 3-7861-4111-8
- Heinrich Amersdorffer: Work Biography: arts and education, a life in tension between improvisation and organization, Rembrandt-Verlag, Berlin, 1978. ISBN 3-7925-0256-9

== See also ==
- List of German painters
