= Jan Baptist van der Meiren =

Belgian painter

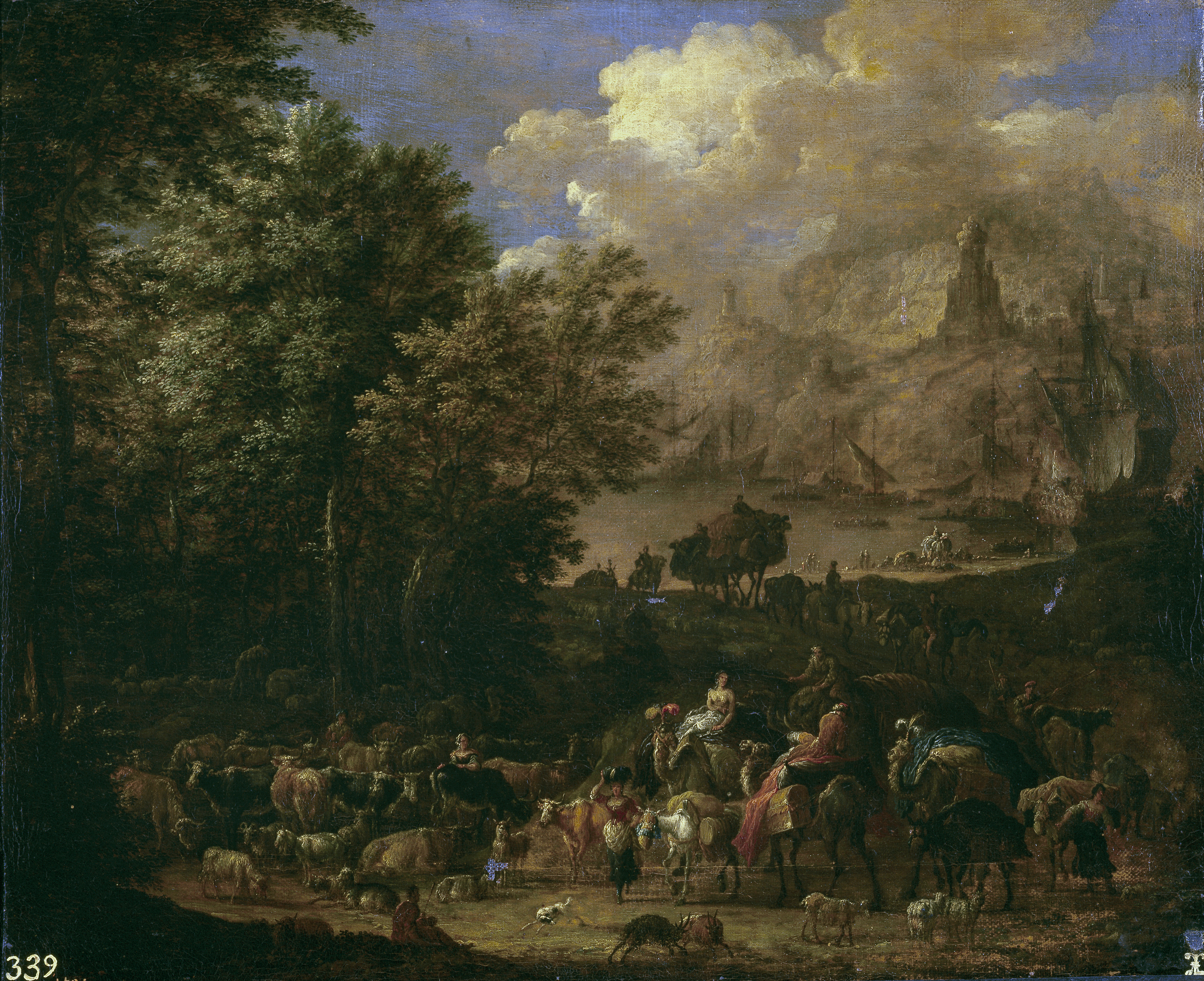
The journeys of Jacob

Jan Baptist van der Meiren (Antwerp, 1664 – in or after 1708) was a Flemish painter specializing in small, usually animated landscapes, harbour views and battle scenes with numerous figures. Aside from time spent in Vienna in 1695, he worked all of his career in Antwerp.

== Life ==
Jan Baptist van der Meiren was born in Antwerp on 15 December 1664. There are no details on his training. He was admitted as a master in the Antwerp Guild of Saint Luke in 1685. Despite a lack of documentary evidence, some historians have speculated that he may have visited Italy since his work displays many Italianizing elements.

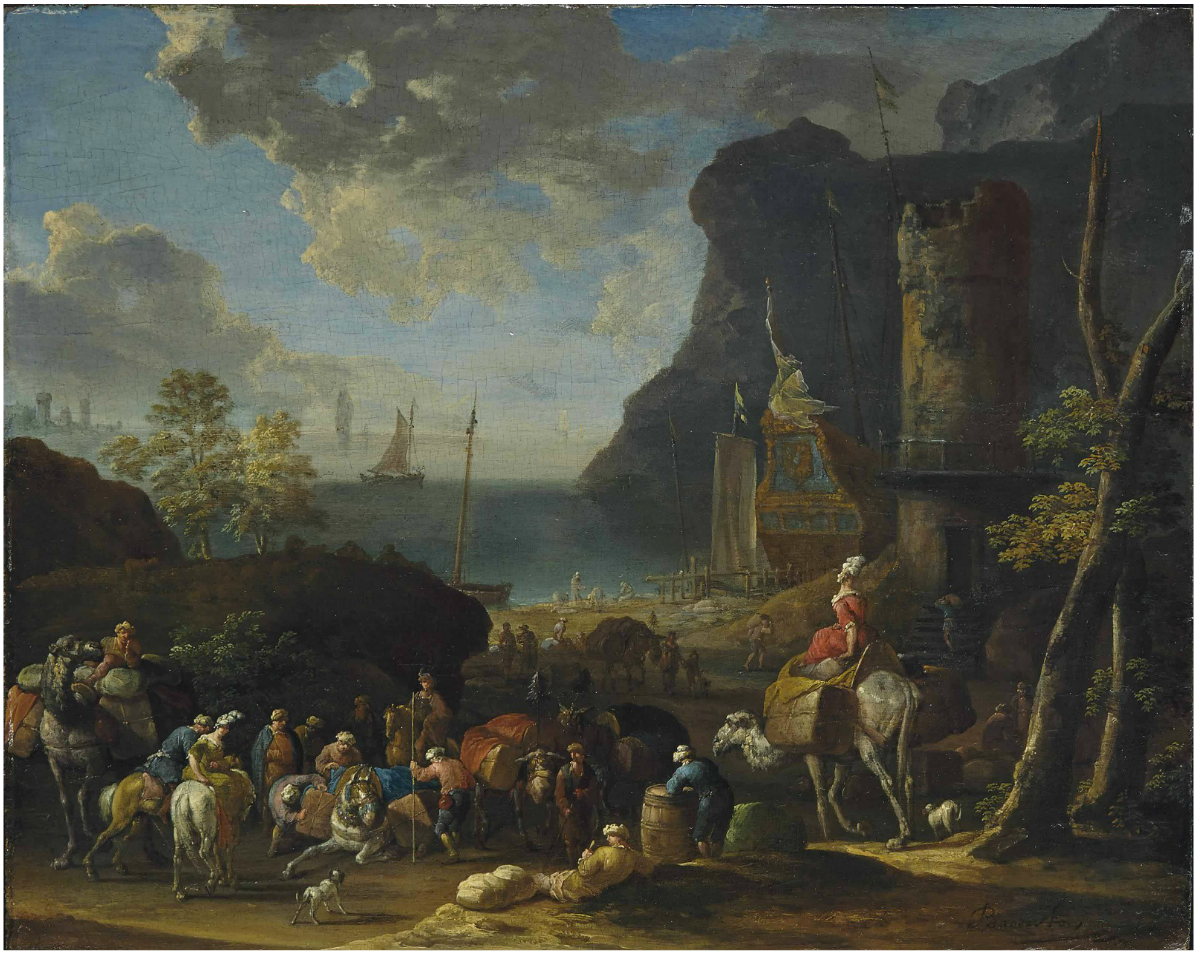
Mediterranean harbour scene with Turkish merchants loading a caravan

Aside from time spent in Vienna in 1695, he worked all of his career in Antwerp. He married Catharina Tassaert in 1690. He took on Jasper Broers as a pupil in 1695. When in 1700 he was elected dean of the Antwerp Guild of Saint Luke, he paid a sum of 300 guilders to be excused from the execution of this charge.

Jan Baptist van der Meiren was very successful working in the established Flemish genres and enjoyed the international patronage of prominent collectors such as Elisabeth Farnese. His compositions commanded high prices at the time.

The date of his death is not clear but the assumption is that he must have died between 1700 and 1708. If the attribution to van der Meiren of a composition dated 1736 in the collection of the Museum of Western and Oriental Art in Kyiv is correct it points to a death date in or after 1736.

== Work ==
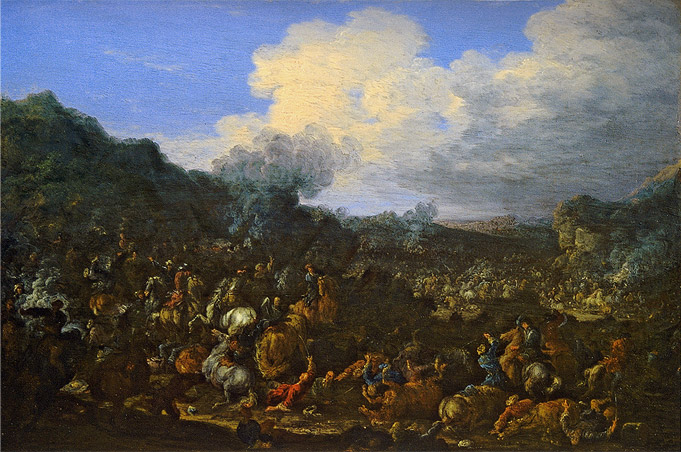
Cavalry battle

Jan Baptist van der Meiren painted small landscapes with scenes of Italianised markets and ports in the same vein as Pieter Bout. He also painted cavalry encounters and biblical scenes in exotic landscapes. He occasionally painted the figures in the landscapes of Adriaen Frans Boudewijns.

Van der Meiren liked to paint in small format and to use the technique of oil on copper. This medium enhanced the brightness and liveliness of his colours, with strong shades of blue and green, which was typical for the Flemish style. His brushwork is quick and vibrant but lacks creativity. The small-scale format and copper medium that he preferred facilitated the export of his compositions. The Antwerp art dealers Forchondt commissioned him to enliven for the export a number of landscapes by other artists such as Adriaen Frans Boudewyns and Lucas van Uden.

Van der Meiren's work influenced other Antwerp painters such as Arnold Frans Rubens and Peter Tillemans.
