= Frans Breydel =

Flemish painter and draftsman

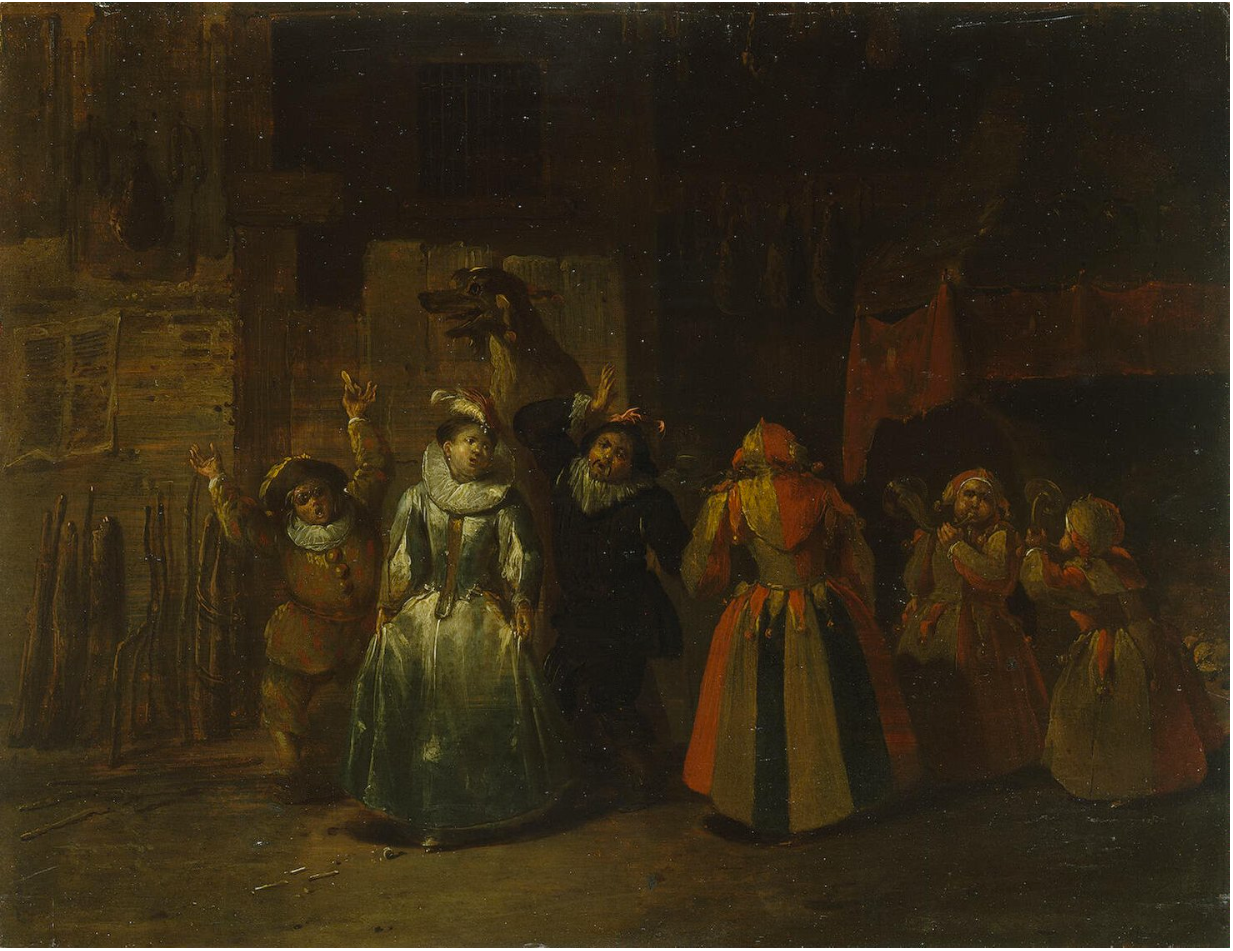
The mummers

Frans Breydel or Frans Breydel I (1679 in Antwerp – 1750 in Antwerp) was a Flemish painter, draftsman and decorative painter (of interiors). He is known for his merry companies, carnival scenes, landscapes and battle pieces.

== Life ==
The details about Frans Breydel's life are sketchy. Frans Breydel was a younger brother of the painter Karel Breydel. There is no information about his training. He left for a trip, maybe to Italy, at an early age but stayed in Kassel when his work was favourably received by local patrons. He was appointed painter to the local court.

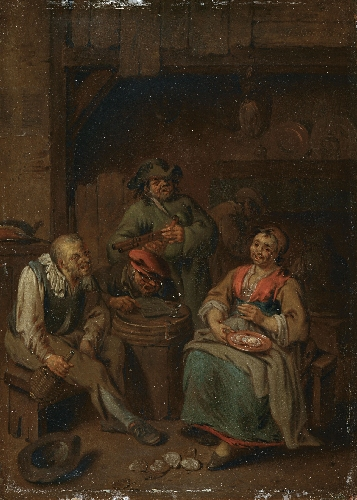
Merry company

When his brother Karel left for a trip to Italy and heard about Frans' success in Kassel, he abandoned his plans to go to Italy and travelled instead to Kassel to join his brother. Here the two brothers worked together for two years with considerable success. Karel Breydel then travelled to Amsterdam.

Frans later left Kassel for London where he linked up with the Dutch painter Herman van der Mijn. This must have been before 1724. Little is known about the remainder of his life. According to the French 18th-century biographer Jean-Baptiste Descamps, Frans Breydel died in Antwerp in 1750 where he was buried in the St. Andrew's Church.

== Work ==
He first specialised in portraits but changed to merry companies, a genre which was very popular in France at the time.
