= Karel Breydel =

Flemish painter

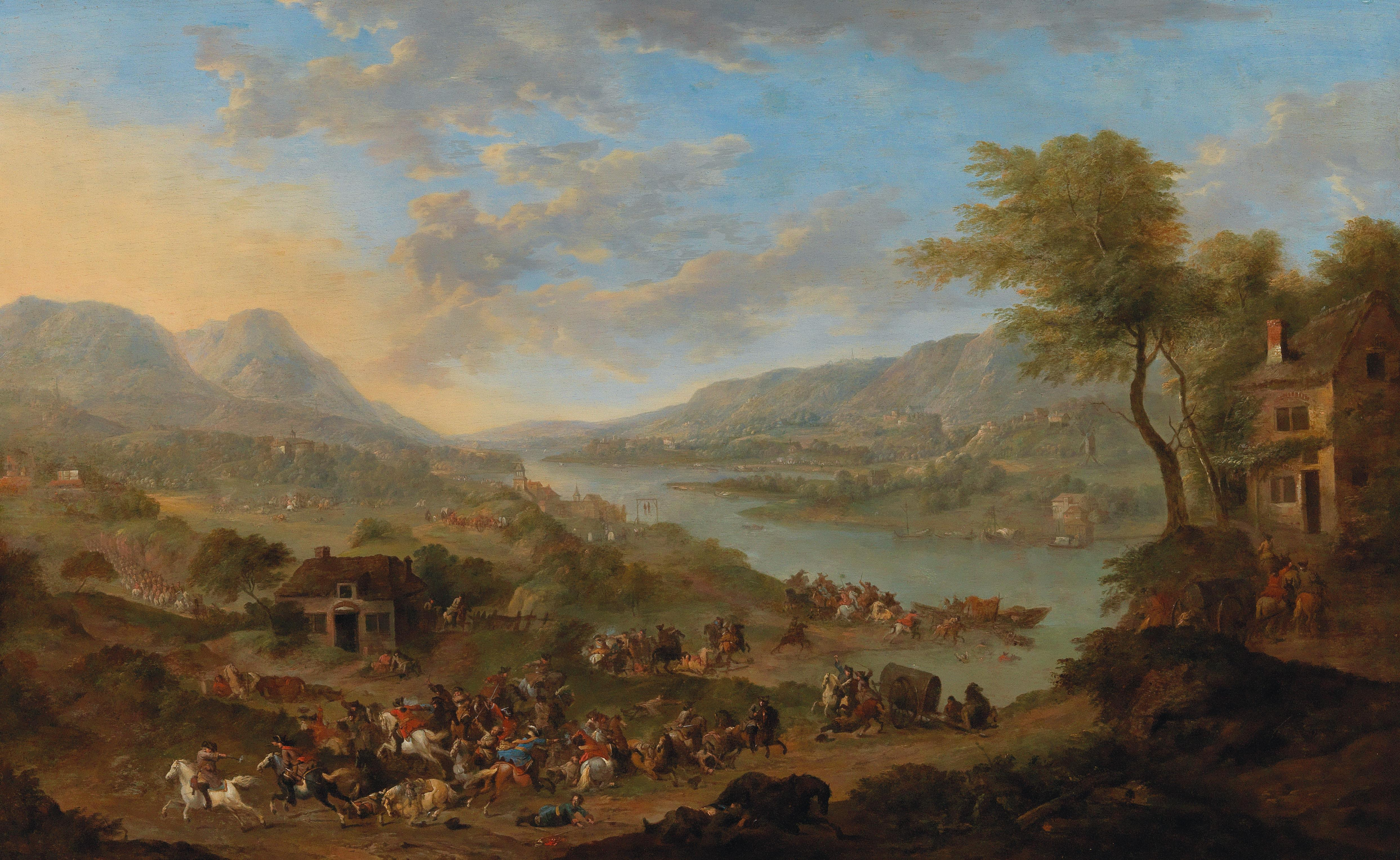
Cavalry skirmish

Karel Breydel or Carel Breydel, called 'Le Chevalier' (1678 in Antwerp – 1733 in Antwerp) was a Flemish painter of battle pieces, equestrian paintings and landscapes.

== Life ==
Very few details about the life of Karel Breydel have been recorded. Most of the information about Karel Breydel's life is based on the writings of the French 18th-century biographer Jean-Baptiste Descamps who included a lengthy biography of Breydel in his La Vie des Peintres Flamands, Allemands et Hollandois. This information is not very reliable as Descamps was prone to inventing stories to make his biographies more interesting.

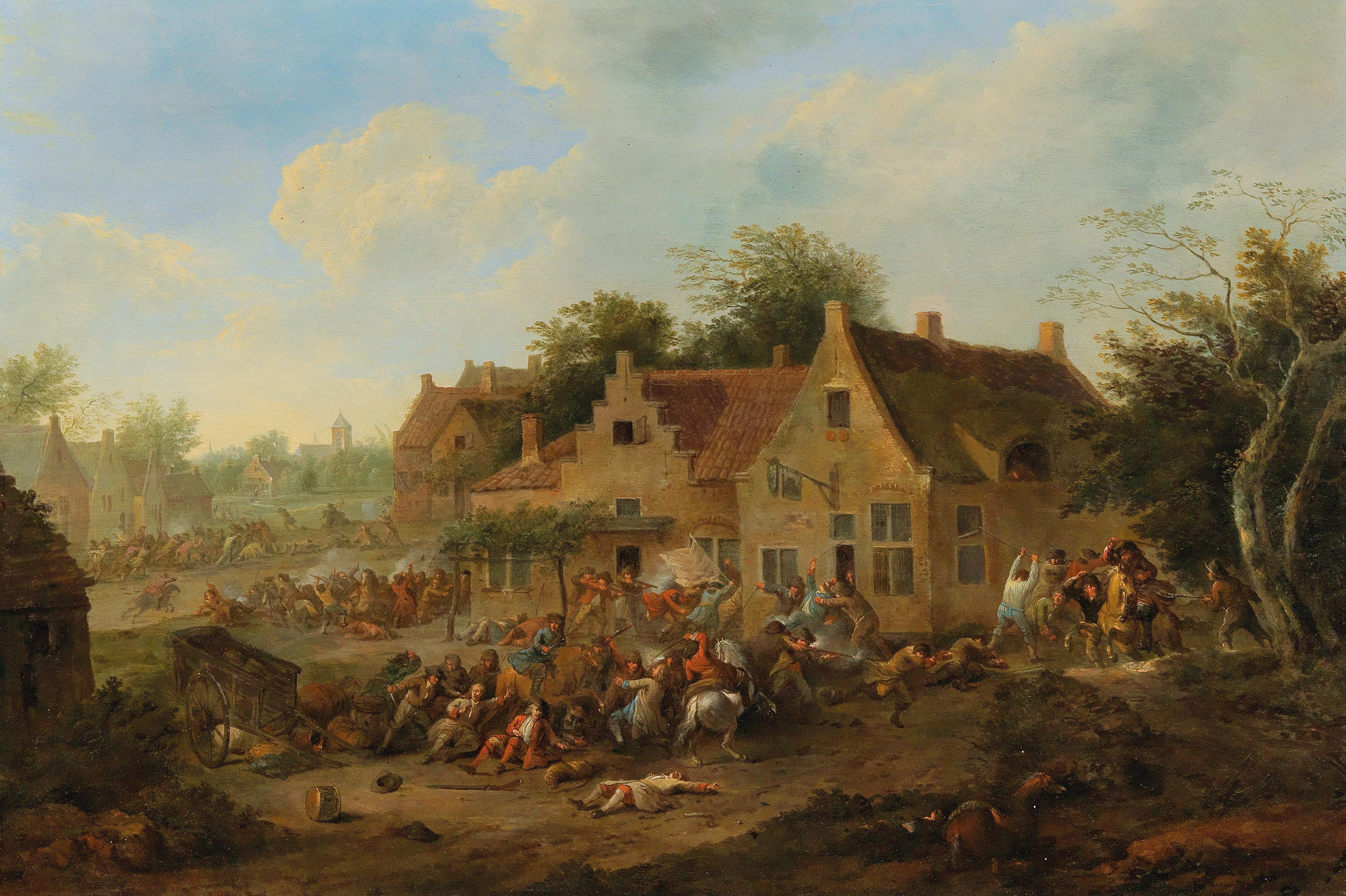
Skirmish on the outskirts of a town

Karel Breydel was an older brother of Frans Breydel, who became court painter in Kassel. He was in Antwerp a pupil of Pieter Rijsbraeck for three years and then of Peter Ykens. He left for a trip to Italy and travelled via Frankfurt and Nuremberg. When he heard about his brother's success in Kassel, he abandoned his plans to go to Italy and travelled instead to Kassel to join his brother. Here the two brothers worked together for two years with considerable success. Breydel then travelled to Amsterdam. He was back in Antwerp in 1703 where he became a master of the Guild of Saint Luke in 1704.

He is recorded in Brussels in 1723 and in Ghent in 1726. He is now believed to have died in Antwerp in 1733 although Descamps states he died in Ghent in 1744.

== Work ==
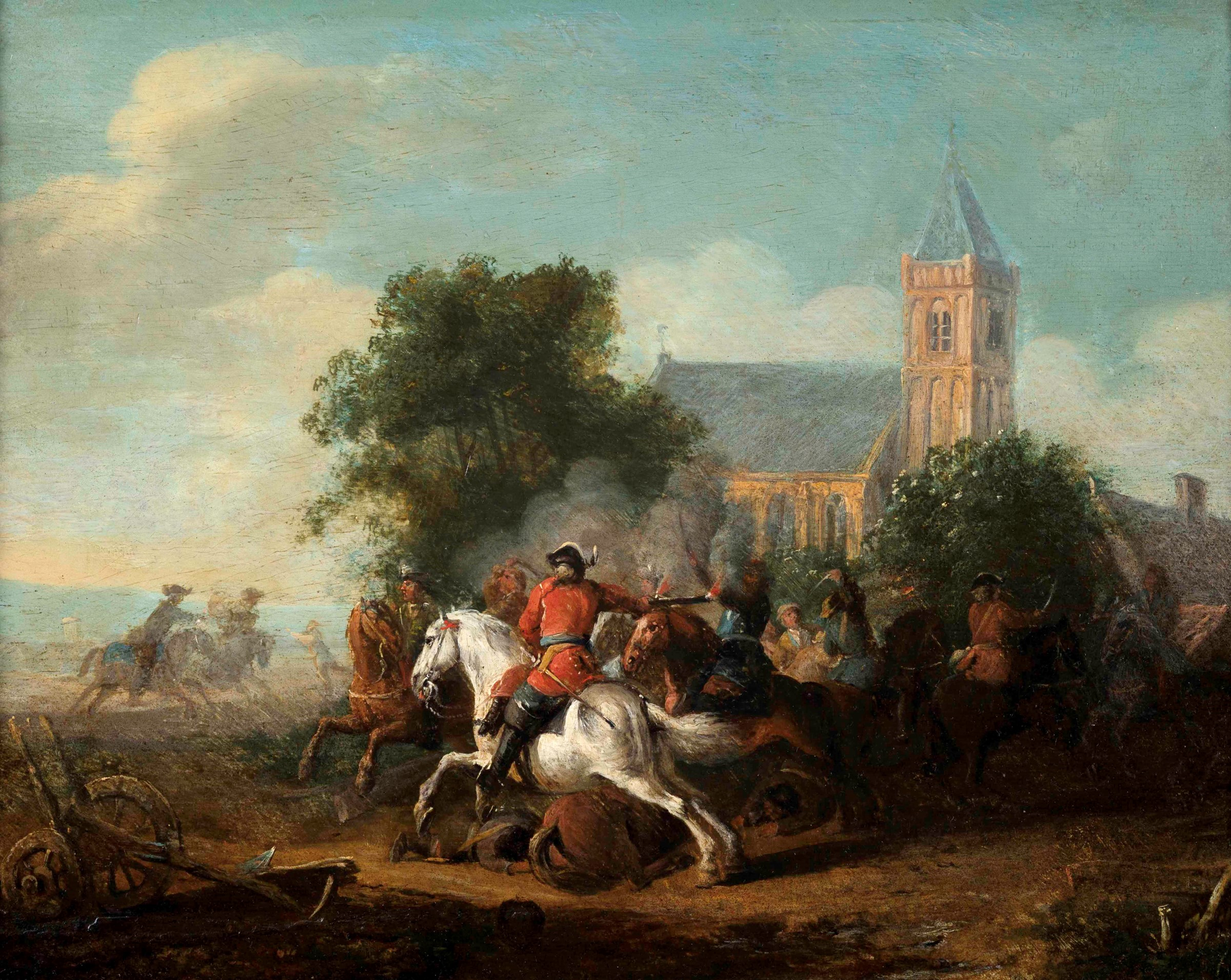
Battle piece

Karel Breydel is known as a painter of battle pieces and cavalry attacks. These paintings are ingeniously composed and painted with spirit after the manner of Adam Frans van der Meulen, the leading Flemish battle painter of the 17th century. He also executed a number of landscapes and views of the Rhine in the manner of Griffier.

Breydel worked as a copyist and produced in 1703 copies after Griffier and Jan Brueghel the Elder for art dealer Jakob de Vos in Amsterdam.

Several leading European museums own paintings by Breydel.
