= Roman Zenzinger =

Roman Zenzinger (16 July 1903 – 5 November 1990) was an Austrian artist and commercial designer best known for his intense portraits and sketches of soldiers during World War II.

== Biography ==
Roman Zenzinger was born on 16 July 1903 in Olmuetz, Maehren, formally part of Austria. He lived with his parents in different places like Bruenn, Villach, Eisenstadt and St. Veit an der Glan. In Villach he studied at the higher school for architecture and was educated by Carinthian painters. In 1935 he moved to Vienna, where he worked for a number of Viennese newspapers as a caricaturist and as a painter. He was a member of the "Wiener Neustaedter Kunstverein" (art association). From 1936 he worked with a partner as a commercial artist.

He was drafted in April 1941 into the German army as a war painter. He worked mainly in Veldes/ Oberkrain now Bled in Slowenia, Triest and in Serbia and Kosovo. From Feb 1943 until Feb 1944 he worked in the film and picture office of the police “Film und Bildstelle der Ordnungspolizei" and after that till the April 1945 in the “SS Standarte Kurt Eggers" Kommando Adria in Triest. (The SS-Standarte Kurt Eggers was a German war correspondent group which reported on the auctions of the Waffen SS combat formations) He often was called to Berlin to deliver his work personally to higher ranks.

His next assignment in Triest was work for the magazine Adria-Illustrierte (Adria magazine) until the end of the war. Some of his work was shown in an exhibition in Berlin 1943, and some of his paintings were printed in the catalogue I Kriegsmaler der Ordnungspolizei (war painters of the police). Some of his works was used for title pages of the Nazi Newspaper "Voelkischer Beobachter" (observer of the people). One of them carried his title painting "Berlin brennt" (Berlin is burning). All of his work in oil was lost after the end of the war. It must have been destroyed or looted.

Nevertheless, Zenzinger could save a lot of his drawings showing the life of the soldiers during the war which his son Gunnar inherited after his death. They were never shown to the public until 2011. He never was a member of the Nazi party. Zenzinger ensured that he obtained papers after the war to show that he was never involved in Nazi activities.

After 1945 he worked as a painter and commercial artist and owned a firm with 14 employees. He also painted in a private capacity sometimes using his pseudonym Zero (shortening for Zenzinger Roman).

Zenzinger died on 5 November 1990 in Vienna.
