= Alfred Hierl =

German artist

Olympic medal record

Art competitions
| Silver medal – second place | 1936 Berlin | Applied graphics |

Alfred Hierl (8 March 1910 – 25 September 1950) was a German artist from Munich. In 1936 he won a silver medal in the art competitions of the Olympic Games for his poster "Internationales Avusrennen" ("International Avus Race").

Hierl died in Traunstein. Several paintings are exhibited in the Canadian War Museum Ottawa.
