= Allan S. Walker =

Australian Army officer and medical historian (1887–1958)

Allan Seymour Walker
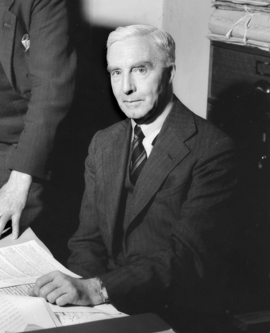
- At the Australian War Memorial on 19 June 1945
- Born: 19 June 1887; Richmond, New South Wales
- Died: 8 January 1958 (aged 70); Sydney, New South Wales
- Military career
- Allegiance: Australia
- Branch: Australian Army
- Service years: 1915–1944
- Rank: Colonel
- Service number: NX246
- Commands: 2/1st Australian General Hospital
- Conflicts: First World War; Second World War; Western Desert campaign; New Guinea campaign
- Awards: Mentioned in Despatches (2)

Allan Seymour Walker (19 June 1887 – 8 January 1958) was an Australian Army officer who served in First and Second World Wars, a medical practitioner, and a military and medical historian who wrote the four medical volumes of the official history series Australia in the War of 1939–1945.

== Early life ==
Allan Seymour Walker was born in Richmond, New South Wales, on 19 June 1887 the son of two schoolteachers, Thomas Walker and his wife Kate, née McCredie. He attended Leichardt Superior Public School. In July 1900, he won a scholarship to Sydney High School. He won medals in English at the Junior Public Examinations in 1903, and the Senior Public Examinations in 1905. He entered the University of Sydney in 1906, graduating his Bachelor of Medicine (MB) in 1910, and Master of Surgery (ChM) in 1912. After completing his two-year residency at Royal Prince Alfred Hospital in Sydney, he established at general practice in Parkes, New South Wales. On 24 March 1914, he married Beatrice M. Phillips at St John's Cathedral, Parramatta. They had two daughters.

== Military career ==
During the First World War, Walker joined the Australian Army Medical Corps as a captain on 1 July 1916, and served in Australia. He returned to the University of Sydney for postgraduate study, earning his Doctor of Medicine degree in 1922, and was awarded the university medal. He established a new practice in the Sydney suburb of Summer Hill, New South Wales. After further postgraduate study in England he became a consultant physician. He was assistant physician at Royal Prince Alfred Hospital in 1922, a physician in 1933, and a consulting physician in 1945. He also became a demonstrator in pathology at the university in 1928, and a lecturer in clinical medicine in 1937. In addition, he was a consultant physician at St George, Canterbury, Western Suburbs and Parramatta district hospitals, and was a physician and a director at the Queen Victoria Homes for Consumptives. He was a councillor of the New South Wales branch of the British Medical Association from 1934 to 1939, and was the first honorary secretary of the Royal Australasian College of Physicians from 1938 to 1944, after which he was a council member from 1944 to 1956, and served as its vice president from 1948 to 1950.

Walker remained on the Army's Reserve of Officers, and was promoted to major on 8 December 1937. He enlisted in the Second Australian Imperial Force and was promoted to the rank of lieutenant colonel on 13 October 1939, and received the AIF service number NX246. He commanded the 2/1st Australian General Hospital in the Middle East, for which he was twice mentioned in despatches. He returned to Australia in December 1941, and was appointed a consultant physician to Headquarters, Allied Land Forces, South West Pacific Area, with the rank of colonel. He went to New Guinea twice, from 26 October to 2 December 1942, and again from 4 January to 4 March 1943, when he was attached to the 2/9th Australian General Hospital. He was discharged from the army on 15 June 1944, returning to the Reserve of Officers.

== Official History ==
Walker was approached by the editor of the official history series Australia in the War of 1939–1945, Gavin Long, to write the medical volumes of the series, but he declined, as he preferred to return to teaching. Long then commissioned Rupert Downes to write it, but Downes was killed in an air crash while engaged in this work on 5 March 1945. Walker was then approached again, and this time he accepted. His appointment was announced in June 1945. It carried with it the pay of a colonel, which was much less than that of a consulting physician.

In June 1945, Walker met with Long and A. G. Butler, who wrote the medical volumes of the Official History of Australia in the War of 1914–1918 series, at the Australian War Memorial in Canberra. Like Butler, he adopted a chronological approach to the history, in keeping with the commemorative aspects of the official history. However Walker became a member of the Official Medical Historians liaison committee, composed of official medical historians from the British Commonwealth countries and the United States of America, and chaired its second meeting, in Canberra in 1949. The committee resolved to give priority to the writing of clinical volumes, to disseminate the medical lessons of the war as widely and rapidly as possible. Accordingly, Walker gave priority to a topical volume, which became Clinical Problems of War (1952), and which was published first. He then reverted to the chronological narratives, with the volumes on the medical services in the Middle East and Far East (1953) and The Island Campaigns (1957). Declining health caused him to resign in 1956, before he had completed the final volume on the Medical Services of the RAN and RAAF (1961), and it had to be completed by others.

Walker died from cerebrovascular disease at Royal Prince Alfred Hospital on 8 January 1958, and his remains were cremated.

== Bibliography ==
- Walker, Allan S. (1952). Clinical Problems of War. Canberra: Australian War Memorial.
- Walker, Allan S. (1953). Middle East and Far East. Canberra: Australian War Memorial.
- Walker, Allan S. (1957). The Island Campaigns. Canberra: Australian War Memorial.
- Walker, Allan S. (1961). Medical Services of the RAN and RAAF. Canberra: Australian War Memorial.
