= Rupert Downes =

Australian soldier (1885–1945)

Rupert Downes CMG, KStJ, VD, FRACS
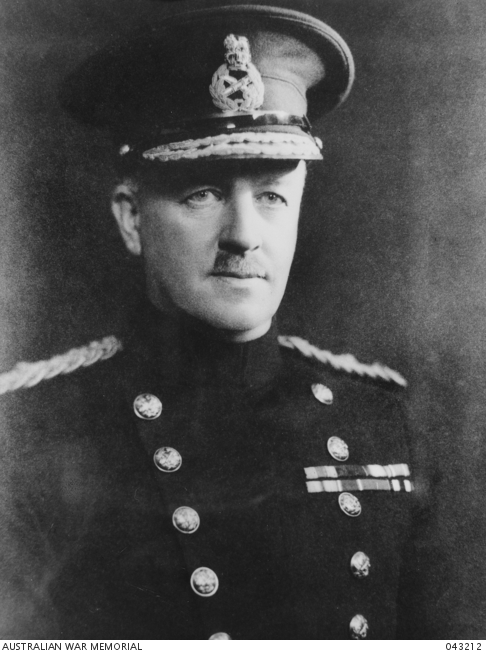
- Born: 10 February 1885; Mitcham, South Australia
- Died: 5 March 1945 (aged 60) near Cairns, Queensland
- Burial place: Cairns War Cemetery
- Relatives: Major Downes (father)
- Military career
- Allegiance: Australia
- Branch: Australian Army
- Service years: 1901–1903; 1908–1945
- Rank: Major General
- Service number: VX57673
- Unit: Australian Army Medical Corps
- Commands: 2nd Light Horse Field Ambulance; 3rd Light Horse Field Ambulance
- Conflicts: First World War; Battle of Gallipoli; Sinai and Palestine campaign; Second World War
- Awards: Companion of the Order of St Michael and St George; Knight of Grace of the Venerable Order of Saint John; Volunteer Decoration; Mentioned in Despatches (4)

Major General Rupert Major Downes (10 February 1885 – 5 March 1945) was an Australian soldier, surgeon and historian.

The son of British Army officer Major Francis Downes, Downes joined the Australian Army as a trumpeter while he was still at school. He attended the University of Melbourne, graduating with his medical degrees in 1907 and a Doctor of Medicine degree in 1911. He was commissioned as a captain in the Australian Army Medical Corps in 1908, and after the outbreak of World War I he joined the First Australian Imperial Force (AIF) in 1914 as its youngest lieutenant colonel. He served in the Gallipoli campaign, and was appointed Assistant Director of Medical Services (ADMS) of the newly formed Anzac Mounted Division in 1916, which he combined with the post of ADMS AIF Egypt. In 1917, he became Deputy Director of Medical Services (DDMS) of the Desert Mounted Corps. After the war, he wrote articles on medical aspects of the Sinai and Palestine campaign, and the section on the campaign for the Official History of Australia in the War of 1914–1918.

Returning to Australia, Downes became an honorary consulting surgeon at the Royal Children's Hospital, Melbourne, and Royal Victorian Eye and Ear Hospital, and honorary surgeon at Prince Henry's Hospital. He became a foundation fellow of the College of Surgeons of Australasia in 1927, and president of the Victorian branch of the British Medical Association in 1935. He lectured on medical ethics at the University of Melbourne, writing the course textbook. He was also Victorian state commissioner of the St John Ambulance Brigade, which he led for 25 years, and president of the St John Ambulance Association for eight years.

In 1934 Downes became Director General of Medical Services, the Australian Army's most senior medical officer, with the rank of major general. He oversaw the construction of major military hospitals in the capital cities. In 1944 he accepted a commission to edit the medical series volumes of the Official History of Australia in the War of 1939–1945 but he was killed in a plane crash in March 1945, before he could begin the work.

== Education and early life ==
Rupert Major Downes was born on 10 February 1885 in Mitcham, South Australia. He was the youngest of fifteen children of Colonel Major Francis Downes—a British Army officer—and his wife Helen Maria, née Chamberlin, only five of whom survived to adulthood. After service in the Crimean War, Colonel Francis Downes served as commandant of the Colonial forces of South Australia and Victoria and retired with the rank of major general in the Australian Army in 1902.

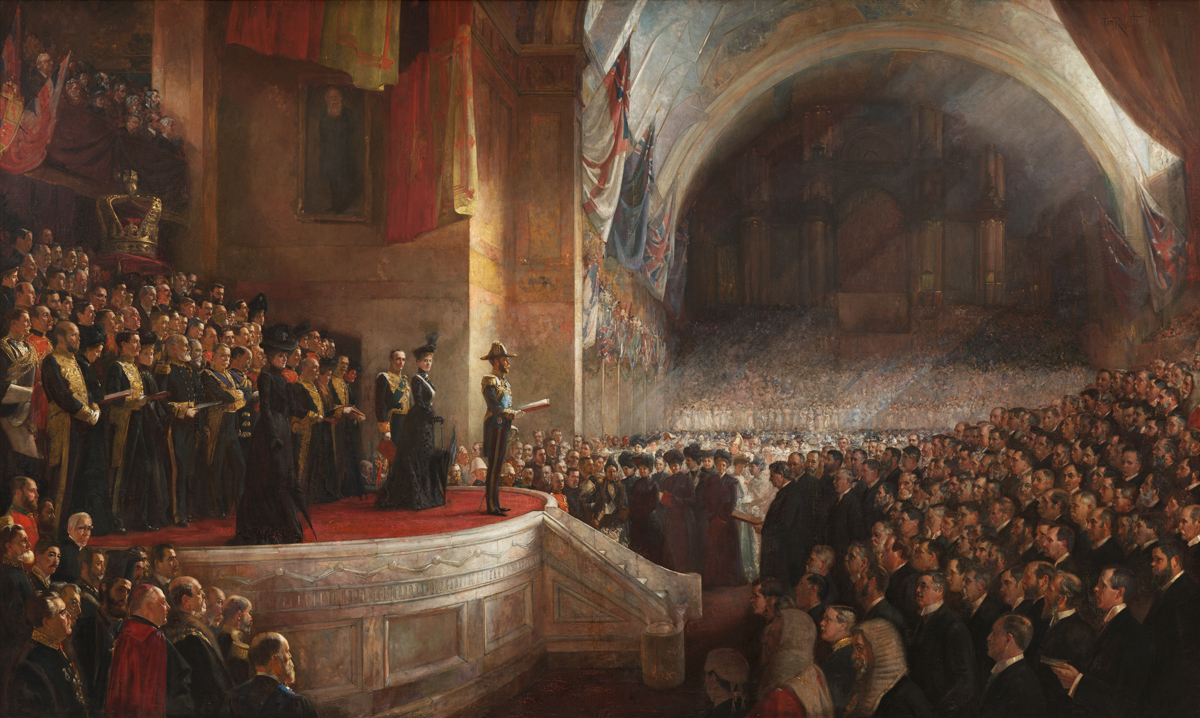
Tom Roberts's The Big Picture painting of the opening of the first parliament in 1901. Downes is in the white helmet, behind the Duke of Cornwall and York's legs.

Rupert was educated at Haileybury in Melbourne as a boarding school student. In March 1901, at the age of 16, he joined the Victorian Horse Artillery (St Kilda Battery), a part-time volunteer militia unit, as a trumpeter. In May 1901 he served in this capacity at the opening of the inaugural Parliament of Australia by The Duke of Cornwall and York at the Royal Exhibition Building. He left the Army in 1903. That year he became a medical student at the University of Melbourne. A good result in his first year examinations earned him a residential scholarship to Ormond College, and he graduated with the double degree of Bachelor of Medicine and Bachelor of Surgery (MBBS) in 1907.

Soon after graduation, Downes re-enlisted in the Army. He was commissioned as a captain in the Australian Army Medical Corps on 1 July 1908 and promoted to major on 26 March 1913. He served his residency at Melbourne Hospital and became a general practitioner in Malvern, Victoria, but soon returned to the university to pursue a doctorate. His Doctor of Medicine (MD) thesis, entitled "The anatomical relations of the thymus, especially considered in regard to thymic death with an account of cases of abnormality", was accepted in 1911. He also did the coursework for a Master of Surgery (MS), and this degree was conferred in 1912.

Downes married Doris Mary Robb on 20 November 1913 at St John's Church, Toorak. They had three children, all given the same middle name as Rupert: Rosemary Major, born in 1914; Valerie Major, born in March 1918; and John Rupert Major, born in 1922.

== First World War ==
Downes joined the Australian Imperial Force (AIF) on 2 October 1914, shortly after the outbreak of the First World War, assuming command of the 2nd Light Horse Field Ambulance with the rank of lieutenant colonel; this made him the youngest officer of that rank in the AIF at the time. Soon after his taking command, the unit was renamed the 3rd Light Horse Field Ambulance. After training at the Broadmeadows Army Camp near Melbourne, the unit embarked for Egypt on the transport SS Chilka on 2 February 1915.

After the early fighting in the Gallipoli campaign, the need for reinforcements became acute, and the commander of British Troops in Egypt, Lieutenant General Sir John Maxwell, decided to ship the light horse brigades to the Anzac Cove lodgement without their horses. The 3rd Light Horse Field Ambulance departed Alexandria for Anzac on 17 May 1915. It moved to Lemnos in June, where it operated a hospital, but returned to Anzac for the August offensive. Downes missed this operation, as he remained on Lemnos supervising the hospital until he returned to Anzac on 11 August. He remained with his unit until 13 November, when he departed for Lemnos and then Egypt.

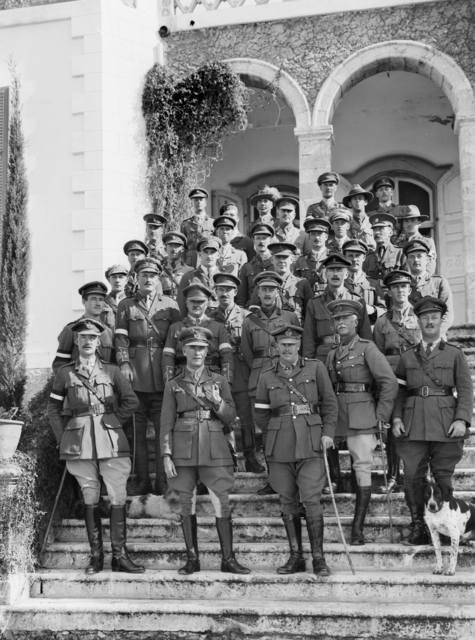
Lieutenant General Sir Harry Chauvel (front and centre) with his Desert Mounted Corps Headquarters. Downes is immediately behind and to the right of Chauvel

After the evacuation of Gallipoli, Downes was appointed Assistant Director of Medical Services (ADMS) of the newly formed Anzac Mounted Division on 15 March 1916. He was given the temporary rank of colonel. Downes combined this post with that of ADMS AIF Egypt from 6 September. Downes therefore had to travel back and forth to Cairo. In November 1916, a Deputy ADMS was appointed to assist him.

Medically speaking, the health of the Anzac Mounted Division was remarkably good, but the Sinai Peninsula still had its challenges—especially for medical officers unfamiliar with conditions in the Middle East. The Battle of Romani revealed the importance of transportation in an area with few roads. A poorly organised casualty evacuation effort caused preventable hardship and suffering for the wounded, and resulted in several avoidable deaths. An inquiry into the matter was held after the battle, at which Downes was called to testify. The Commander in Chief of the Egyptian Expeditionary Force (EEF), General Sir Archibald Murray, declined to assign blame to any individual, but implemented the inquiry's recommendations for improving the casualty evacuation process.

There was also the heat, and the problem of supplying adequate quantities of potable water. Diseases included cholera, typhus and bilharzia. To combat these, Downes obtained the services of Lieutenant Colonel Charles James Martin, and created the Anzac Field Laboratory to investigate these diseases. As a result of aggressively tackling the problem, Downes reduced rates of disease among Australian and New Zealand troops well below those of British troops serving alongside them. Martin advanced the notion that heat exhaustion and heat stroke were not the result of defective evaporation, as had previously been believed, but simply a matter of failing to drink enough water. He in turn converted Downes to the belief that "provided water is available in adequate amount the heat mechanism of the body can defy all ordinary climatic ranges of temperature even under conditions of hard work."

With so many people and horses, sanitation was a challenge, and discipline in this area was initially slack, as it had been with disastrous results at Gallipoli. Downes took measures to improve the situation. Although not normally one to engage in disputes, Downes repeatedly clashed with the British medical officers of the EEF, especially the Director of Medical Services (DMS) EEF, Colonel Alfred Keble, whose attitudes Downes regarded as endangering his troops. Downes's rank of colonel became substantive on 20 February 1917. Doris travelled to Egypt to visit her husband in March 1917. By June, Rupert was becoming increasingly immersed in preparations for the Third Battle of Gaza and Doris, who had become pregnant during her visit, decided to return home. On her return journey to Australia in June 1917, her ship, the P&O liner RMS Mongolia struck a mine and sank in the Indian Ocean with the loss of 23 lives. Doris spent 11 hours in a crowded lifeboat, before being rescued by a passing steamer, which took her to Bombay. From there she eventually made her way back to Australia via Singapore and Batavia. In 1918 she was appointed an Officer of the Order of the British Empire (OBE) for her volunteer work among soldiers' families as secretary of the Friendly Union of Soldiers' Wives and Mothers.

On 10 August 1917, Downes became Deputy Director of Medical Services (DDMS) of the Desert Mounted Corps, while still retaining the post of ADMS AIF Egypt. He was therefore answerable to three superiors—to Lieutenant General Harry Chauvel, the commander of the Desert Mounted Corps and AIF Egypt; to Major General Neville Howse, the DMS AIF in London; and to the new British DMS EEF, Major General William Travers Swan. As the EEF advanced into Palestine, the major medical problem remained transportation. During the operations in the Es Salt area, Downes experimented with the delivery of drugs and medical supplies by air. In the Jordan valley in 1918, Downes was confronted with an epidemic of malaria and vigorous preventative and prophylactic efforts were required to bring it under control.

In October 1918, with victory near, Downes was confronted by his most serious medical crisis. Damascus contained over 3,000 sick and wounded Turkish soldiers, many of them in appalling condition, who were now prisoners of war. He appointed the DADMS of the Australian Mounted Division, Major W. Evans, as Principal Medical Officer of Damascus, and gave him orders to organise the medical arrangements, bury the dead and provide care for the living. The task was made more difficult by the poor communications and transport shortages, which hampered the delivery of supplies and evacuation of the hospitals; by shortages of medical units; and by the actions of Lieutenant Colonel T. E. Lawrence, who was more concerned with establishing the political authority of Hussein bin Ali, Sharif of Mecca over Damascus. At this point the Desert Mounted Corps itself began to experience epidemic diseases, particularly of bronchopneumonia, cholera and malaria, putting the medical services under great strain. Through extraordinary measures, including the diversion of lighthorsemen and motor vehicles to medical units, Downes managed to evacuate the sick to Beirut, and the crisis abated.

For his service in the Sinai and Palestine campaign, Downes was mentioned in despatches four times, and was appointed a Companion of the Order of St Michael and St George on 1 January 1918. His citation read:

In addition to his duties as ADMS Australian and New Zealand Mounted Division, Colonel Downes has carried out those of A.D.M.S., Australian Imperial Force in Egypt for many months. He has shown considerable administrative ability and has placed Australian A.M.C. matters on a much better footing than they were when he took over the appointment.

== Interwar years ==
Returning to Australia, Downes was discharged from the AIF, but remained in the Army as a reservist. He became an honorary consulting surgeon at the Royal Children's Hospital, Melbourne, and Royal Victorian Eye and Ear Hospital, and honorary surgeon at Prince Henry's Hospital. He was a founding fellow of the College of Surgeons of Australasia in 1927, and became president of the Victorian branch of the British Medical Association in 1935. He established a reputation as one of Melbourne's leading paediatric surgeons, but found himself in disagreement with certain medical practices then in vogue. In a 1922 paper published in the Medical Journal of Australia, he examined 100 cases of tonsillectomy in children, and concluded that the majority of them were unnecessary. It would be another four decades before the medical profession in Australia accepted this. He lectured on medical ethics at the University of Melbourne from the late 1930s until his death in 1945, and wrote a course textbook on the subject, entitled Medical Ethics, which was published in 1942.

Along with his medical writings, Downes wrote a book-length section on the Sinai and Palestine campaign for Volume I of the Official History of the Australian Army Medical Services in the War of 1914–1918, in the late 1920s under the direction of Medical Series editor Graham Butler. The two men had discussed writing a medical history of the campaign during a visit Butler made to Egypt in 1918 to inspect the medical records of the AIF, and again in France in 1919. Downes published an article in the Journal of the British Army Medical Corps entitled "The Tactical Employment of the Medical Services in a Cavalry Corps" in 1926, which he expanded into one of the chapters of the Official History. His manuscript proved too long for the proposed book, and was extensively edited by Butler before it was published in 1930. Downes was instrumental in supporting Butler's Medical Series and helped obtain the funding necessary to complete the project.

Downes was chairman of the Masseurs' Registration Board, a councillor of the Victorian division of the Australian Red Cross, and chairman of the Red Cross National Council. He was Victorian State Commissioner of the St. John Ambulance Brigade for 25 years. He was also president of the St John Ambulance Association for eight years, and chairman of the Victorian Civil Ambulance Service from 1937 to 1938. In 1930, he was appointed a Commander of the Venerable Order of Saint John, and became a Knight of Grace of the order in 1937. At the same time, Doris became an Officer of the Order of Saint John, in recognition of her fundraising efforts for the Victorian branch. She later served as a member of its council from 1942 to 1953. Downes was instrumental in persuading the state branches to come together as a national organisation, arguing that without a national body, the organisation would be eclipsed by the Red Cross.

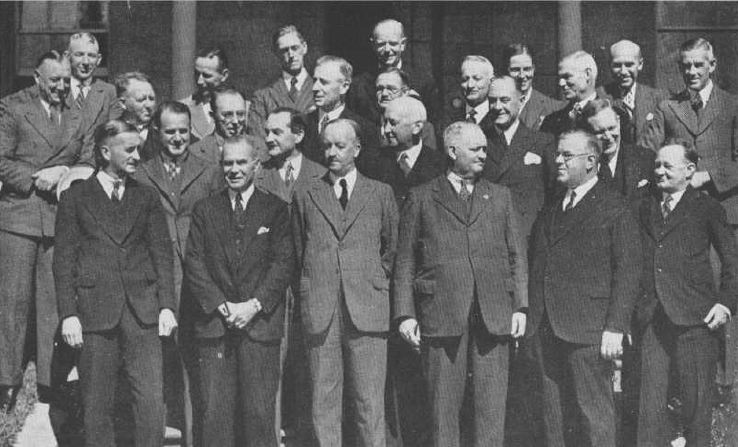
Army Medical officers participate in a training exercise in the southern highlands of New South Wales in April 1936. Downes is front row, third from the left.

Downes remained in the Army throughout the inter-war period. He became a colonel in the Australian Army Medical Corps on 8 January 1920. He was DDMS of the 3rd Military District (Victoria) from 1 July 1921 to 26 June 1933, and Officer in Charge of Voluntary Aid Detachments from 1 July 1921 to 15 March 1940. He also served as head of the medical services of the Royal Australian Air Force (RAAF). Although the RAAF had become a separate service in 1921, the Minister for Defence decided in 1927 that the Army's Director General of Medical Services (DGMS) should be responsible for the administration of the RAAF's medical services. In this capacity, Downes was answerable to the Air Board. He was also honorary surgeon to the Governor General of Australia from 1 July 1927 to 30 June 1931. In 1930, Downes's son John, then in his first year as a boarder at Geelong Grammar School, fell seriously ill with meningitis. Despite the best efforts of two eminent medical practitioners, Keith Fairley and Reginald Webster, John succumbed to toxaemia and died in 1933, at the age of 10. The failure of modern medicine to save his son affected Downes deeply, and led him to abandon his medical career in favour of a military one. On 20 August 1934 Downes became DGMS, a full-time post and the Army's most senior medical officer. His priority was a recruiting campaign to increase the number of medical professionals in the Army.

The 1938 Munich Crisis caused people to believe that another war was imminent, and an Army-wide recruiting campaign led by Major General Sir Thomas Blamey doubled the size of the Army from 35,000 in 1938 to 70,000 in 1939. Downes's efforts at recruiting were far more modest. In 1934, there were 299 part-time officers in the AAMC; by 1939 there were 394, an increase of only 32 per cent. This included 320 medical practitioners, 37 dentists and 13 pharmacists. Downes was acutely aware that a large Army would require mobilisation of the country's doctors, and pushed for all doctors to be prepared for either military service or direction by civil authorities. He presided over a major effort to stockpile drugs and medical equipment required for a mobilisation. With the help of the Department of Health and the Commonwealth Serum Laboratories, most of this was delivered by July 1939. In 1939, Downes began a tour of military and other medical centres in India, the Middle East, the United Kingdom, France, the United States and Canada. While in London, he arranged for Doris and Valerie to be formally presented to the King and Queen at Buckingham Palace by Ethel Bruce, the wife of Stanley Bruce, the Australian High Commissioner to the United Kingdom. Downes foresaw a major war, fought in the islands to the north of Australia. Still in London, he took steps to obtain the services as consultants of two eminent Australian doctors: the surgeon Sir Thomas Dunhill and Neil Hamilton Fairley, an expert on tropical diseases. The outbreak of the Second World War caused Downes to curtail the North American leg of his tour and return to Australia in October 1939.

== Second World War ==
Downes, in his role as DGMS, pressed for the construction of major military hospitals in the state capital cities. He argued that, after the war, they should be handed over to the Repatriation Department for the care of sick and disabled ex-service personnel. Despite strong opposition on the grounds of cost, Downes won his case in October 1940. The major military hospitals in the state capital cities, the Concord Repatriation General Hospital in Sydney, the Austin Hospital in Melbourne and Greenslopes Private Hospital in Brisbane remain part of his legacy. In late 1940, medical units in the Middle East were experiencing "precarious and at times acute" shortages of medicals stores. Units were sent to the Middle East as fully equipped as was possible, with the expectation that the British Army would make up the difference, but British policy was that all possible sources had to be exploited before any demands could be made on the United Kingdom's sources. General Sir Thomas Blamey, the Commander in Chief of the AIF, recognised this as something that had to be negotiated between the two governments, but medical officers in the Middle East blamed the Medical Services in Australia—and therefore Downes—for the situation. The Minister for the Army, Percy Spender decided to pay a visit to the Middle East to see the situation for himself but before he did so, he resolved that Downes should become Director of Medical Services, AIF (Middle East). On arrival in the Middle East with the Chief of the General Staff, Lieutenant General Vernon Sturdee, Spender found that Blamey had already appointed Major General Samuel Burston to that post. This came as a surprise to them as they had not realised that Blamey had the authority to make such an appointment; but on seeing the situation for himself, Spender confirmed Burston's appointment.

On returning to Australia, Spender appointed Major General Frederick Maguire as DGMS and Downes was appointed to the newly created post of Inspector General of Medical Services (IGMS). As IGMS, Downes toured extensively—he visited all the Australian states and overseas locations where Australian troops had been sent, including Papua and New Guinea, Malaya, the Middle East and North Africa, as well as the Netherlands East Indies (Indonesia), India and East Africa. When Blamey reorganised the Army on his return to Australia in 1942, he appointed Burston as Director General of Medical Services. Downes became the DMS of the Second Army on 6 April 1942. He joined the Second AIF as a major general on 27 June 1942, receiving the AIF serial number VX57673.

== Death and legacy ==
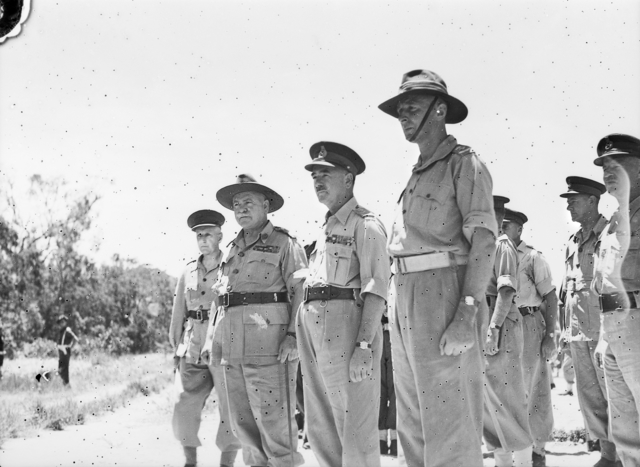
Major General Colin Simpson, General Sir Thomas Blamey and Lieutenant General Sir Leslie Morshead pay their respects at the military funeral service for Major Generals Alan Vasey and Downes in Cairns.

Downes was the DMS of the Second Army until 22 August 1944. Due to the run-down of the Army in the latter stages of the war, the Second Army, always mainly a paper organisation, increasingly had less to do. Now nearly sixty, Downes accepted an invitation to write the medical history series of the Official History of Australia in the War of 1939–1945. As part of this, in March 1945, he decided to accompany Major General George Alan Vasey to New Guinea, where Vasey's 6th Division had encountered an atabrine-resistant strain of malaria in the Aitape-Wewak campaign.

On 5 March 1945, the RAAF Lockheed Hudson aircraft they were travelling in crashed into the sea about 400 yards (370 m) off Machans Beach, just north of the mouth of the Barron River near Cairns in Queensland. Downes and Vasey were killed along with all nine other Australian service personnel on board. Downes became the third most senior Australian officer to die in the Second World War, after General Sir Brudenell White, who died in the Canberra air disaster in 1940, and Lieutenant General Henry Wynter, who died from natural causes on 7 February 1945. The bodies were recovered and buried in the Cairns War Cemetery with full military honours. A memorial service was held at St Paul's Cathedral, Melbourne, on 9 March 1945.

Gavin Long, the editor in chief of the Official History of Australia in the War of 1939–1945, prevailed on Allan S. Walker to write the medical series volumes. Walker discarded Downes's plans to have specialists write different sections, and ultimately wrote three volumes himself, starting with Clinical Problems of War (1952). He was working on the fourth and final volume, on the Medical Services of the RAN and RAAF, when he was compelled to quit in November 1956 due to ill-health, and he died in January 1958. The final volume was finished by others and appeared in 1961. Downes's papers are in the Australian War Memorial. The Royal Australasian College of Surgeons established the triennial Rupert Downes Memorial Lecture in his honour. The subject of the lecture is "related to some aspect or aspects of military surgery, medical equipment (military and civil), the surgery of children, neurosurgery, general surgery, medical ethics or medical history; these being subjects in which Downes was particularly interested".

== Rupert Downes Memorial Lectures ==
- 1950 Major General Samuel Burston Some Medical Aspects of Atomic Warfare
- 1954 A.S. Walker The Following Wind of History
- 1957 Major General Frank Kingsley Norris Be Strong and of Good Courage
- 1961 Sir Albert Coates The Doctor in the Services
- 1965 D. Waterson Œsophageal Replacement in Pædiatric Surgery
- 1970 J.H. Louw The Scientific Method in Surgery
- 1972 H.E. Beardmore Pædiatric Surgery – Yesterday, Today, and Tomorrow, and Tomorrow, and Tomorrow
- 1976 P.P. Rickham Nephroblastoma – a New Look at an Old Problem
- 1978 C.M. Gurner Military Medical Preparedness
- 1980 D.G. Hamilton One Hundred Years of Pædiatric Surgery in Sydney
- 1983 G.B. Ong The Trifacetted Nature of Surgery in Hong Kong
- 1988 B.A. Smithurst Distinguished Australian Military Surgeons
- 1990 Patricia K. Donahoe The Development of Tumour Inhibitors
- 1994 General Sir Phillip Bennett Medical Aspects of Australia's Defence
- 1996 Professor Averil Mansfield Arterio-Venous Malformations and their Treatment
- 1998 Donald Trunkey I am Giddy, Expectation Whirls me Round
- 2000 A. Wyn Beasley Of Scurvy and Shipwreck – the Dutch Discovery of Australasia
- 2002 Colonel D. Beard The Music of Warfare
- 2005 Robert Pearce Trust me, Claudius
- 2008 Professor Arthur Li Ethics and standards
- 2011 Major General John Pearn Pro patria et spe gentis
- 2014 Air Vice Marshal Hugh Bartholomeusz Tissue reconstruction in war and peace
- 2017 Professor Michael Besser The anatomical enlightenment
- 2021 Andrew Connolly Striving for excellence- Enhancing recovery in the Great War

== Notes ==
Military offices
Preceded by Major General George Walter Barber	Director General of Medical Services; 1934–1941	Succeeded by Major General Frederick Maguire
