= Solomon Islands campaign =

Major campaign of the Pacific War of World War II

- Part of the Pacific War of World War II
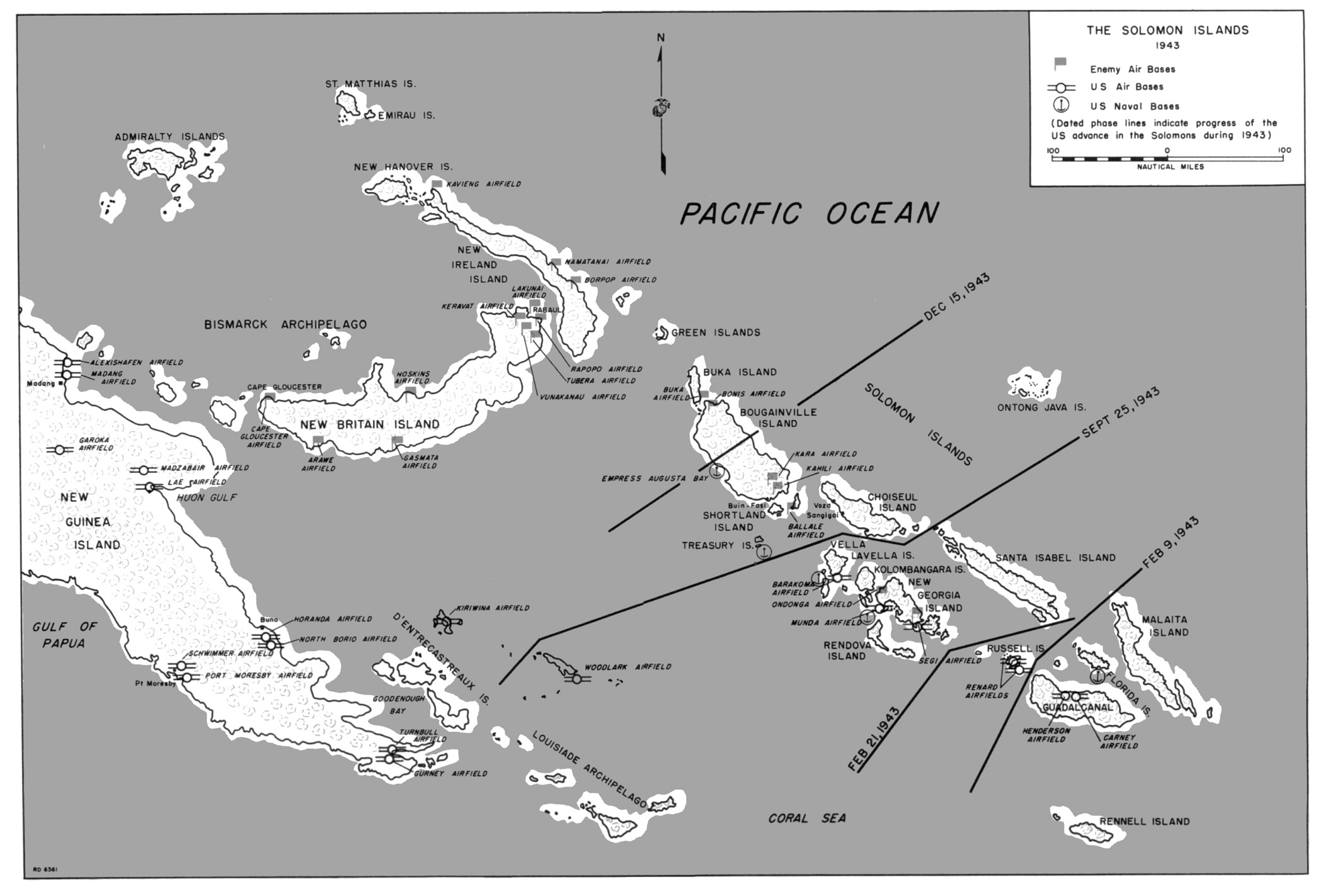
- Map of the Solomon Islands showing the Allied advance during 1943 and key air and naval bases.
Date	January 1942 – August 21, 1945
Location	British Solomon Islands/Territory of New Guinea, South Pacific
Result	Allied victory

Belligerents
United States; United Kingdom • Solomon Islands • Fiji • Tonga; Australia; New Zealand	Japan

Commanders and leaders
POA: (United States) Chester Nimitz (United States) Alexander Vandegrift (United States) Robert Ghormley (United States) William Halsey Jr. (United States) Alexander Patch (United States) Frank Jack Fletcher (United States) Richmond K. Turner; SWPA: (United States) Douglas MacArthur (Australia) Eric Feldt (Note: Commanded the Coastwatchers.) (Australia) Stanley Savige	Imperial Japanese Navy: (Empire of Japan) Isoroku Yamamoto † (Empire of Japan) Chūichi Nagumo (Empire of Japan) Nobutake Kondō (Empire of Japan) Shigeyoshi Inoue (Empire of Japan) Nishizō Tsukahara (Empire of Japan) Jinichi Kusaka; Imperial Japanese Army: (Empire of Japan) Hitoshi Imamura (Empire of Japan) Harukichi Hyakutake (Empire of Japan) Minoru Sasaki (Empire of Japan) Hatazō Adachi

Strength
Unknown	Unknown

Casualties and losses
10,600 killed 40+ ships sunk, 800 aircraft destroyed (Note: Numbers include personnel killed by all causes including combat, disease, and accidents. Ships sunk includes warships and auxiliaries. Aircraft destroyed includes both combat and operational losses.)	86,000 killed 50+ ships sunk, 1,500 aircraft destroyed (Most of the Japanese deaths were from disease or starvation)

The Solomon Islands campaign was a major campaign of the Pacific War during World War II. The campaign began with the Japanese seizure of several areas in the British Solomon Islands and Bougainville, in the Territory of New Guinea, during the first six months of 1942. Japanese troops subsequently began the construction of several naval and air bases in the area. Japan's initial goals were to protect the flank of their ongoing offensive in New Guinea, establish a security barrier for the major Japanese base at Rabaul on New Britain, and construct bases from which they could interdict supply lines between the Allied powers of the United States and Australia and New Zealand.

In order to defend their communication and supply lines in the South Pacific, the Allies initiated a counteroffensive in New Guinea and counterattacked Japanese forces in the Solomons via landings on Guadalcanal (see Guadalcanal campaign) and small neighboring islands on August 7, 1942. The ultimate Allied objective was to capture, isolate, or otherwise neutralize the major Japanese base at Rabaul. These Allied offensives initiated a series of land, air and naval engagements with Japan, beginning with the amphibious landings on Guadalcanal. Over the course of the campaign, multiple major battles were fought in the central and northern Solomons, on and around New Georgia Island, and on Bougainville Island.

In a campaign of attrition fought on land, at sea, and in the air, the Allies inflicted heavy losses on Japanese forces. Japan was ultimately unable to replace these losses, particularly in terms of experienced aircrew and pilots. The Allies retook some of the Solomon Islands by force (although Japanese resistance continued until the end of the war), while simultaneously isolating and otherwise neutralizing other Japanese positions, which were then bypassed. The Solomon Islands campaign eventually converged with the New Guinea campaign.

== Background ==
=== Strategic background ===
On December 7, 1941, after failing to resolve disputes with the United States over the invasion of China and occupation of French Indochina, the Japanese attacked the US Pacific fleet at Pearl Harbor, Hawaii. This surprise attack crippled most of the U.S. Pacific Fleet's battleships instigating a war between the two nations. Attacks on British possessions in the Pacific, beginning with near-simultaneous attacks on British Malaya and Hong Kong, also brought the United Kingdom, Australia, New Zealand and the Dutch East Indies into the conflict. The Japanese sought to neutralize the American and Commonwealth navies, seize territory rich in natural resources, and obtain strategic military bases to defend their newly gained possessions. According to the Japanese Navy's Combined Fleet Secret Order Number One, dated November 1, 1941, the goals of the initial Japanese campaigns were to "[eject] British and American strength from the Netherlands Indies and the Philippines, [and] to establish a policy of autonomous self-sufficiency and economic independence."

The Empire of Japan accomplished its initial strategic objectives in the first six months of the war, capturing Hong Kong, the Philippines, Thailand, Malaya, Singapore, the Dutch East Indies, Wake Island, New Britain, the northern Gilbert Islands, and Guam. A key Japanese goal was to establish a vast defensive perimeter ranging from British India on the west, through the Dutch East Indies in the south, and on to island bases in the south and central Pacific. The large Japanese army and navy base at Rabaul, which had been captured from the Australians in January 1942, anchored the southern flank of this defensive perimeter. In March and April 1942, Japanese forces occupied and began constructing an airfield at Buka in northern Bougainville, as well as an airfield and naval base at Buin, in southern Bougainville.

=== Japanese advance into the Solomons ===
In April 1942, the Japanese Army and Navy jointly initiated Operation Mo, an offensive to capture Port Moresby in New Guinea. Also part of this plan was an IJN operation to capture Tulagi in the southern Solomons. The objective of the operation was for the Japanese to extend their defensive perimeter to the south, and to establish bases to support possible future advances against Nauru, Ocean Island, New Caledonia, Fiji, and Samoa. Japanese strategists believed these advances would cut the supply lines between Australia and the United States, and effectively eliminate Australia as a threat to Japanese positions in the South Pacific. The Japanese Navy also proposed a future invasion of Australia, which was abandoned when the IJA protested that it currently lacked enough troops to support such an operation.

Japanese troops successfully captured Tulagi, but Japanese attempts to capture Port Moresby were repulsed by American naval forces at the Battle of the Coral Sea. Shortly thereafter, the Japanese Navy established small garrisons on various other northern and central Solomon Islands. One month later, the Japanese Combined Fleet lost four fleet aircraft carriers at the Battle of Midway.

The Allies began countering the continued threat to Australia via a build-up of troops and aircraft in the region, with the eventual goal of reconquering the Philippines. In March 1942 Admiral Ernest King, then Commander-in Chief of the U.S. Fleet, had advocated an offensive from the New Hebrides through the Solomon Islands to the Bismarck Archipelago. Following the American victory at Midway, General Douglas MacArthur, who had taken command of the South West Pacific Area, proposed a lightning offensive to retake Rabaul, which the Japanese were fortifying and utilizing as a major base of operations. The United States Navy advocated a more gradual approach from New Guinea and up the Solomon Island chain. These competing proposals were resolved by Admiral King and U.S. Army Chief of Staff General George C. Marshall, who adopted a three-part offensive strategy. The first priority was the capture of the island of Tulagi in the Solomons. Secondly, Allied forces were to advance along the New Guinea coast. Finally, Allied forces would converge on and capture Rabaul. Orders to capture Tulagi were implemented by a directive of the Joint Chiefs of Staff on July 2, 1942, which named the initial attacks Operation Watchtower. This operation would mark the beginning of the Solomon Islands campaign.

== Course of campaign ==
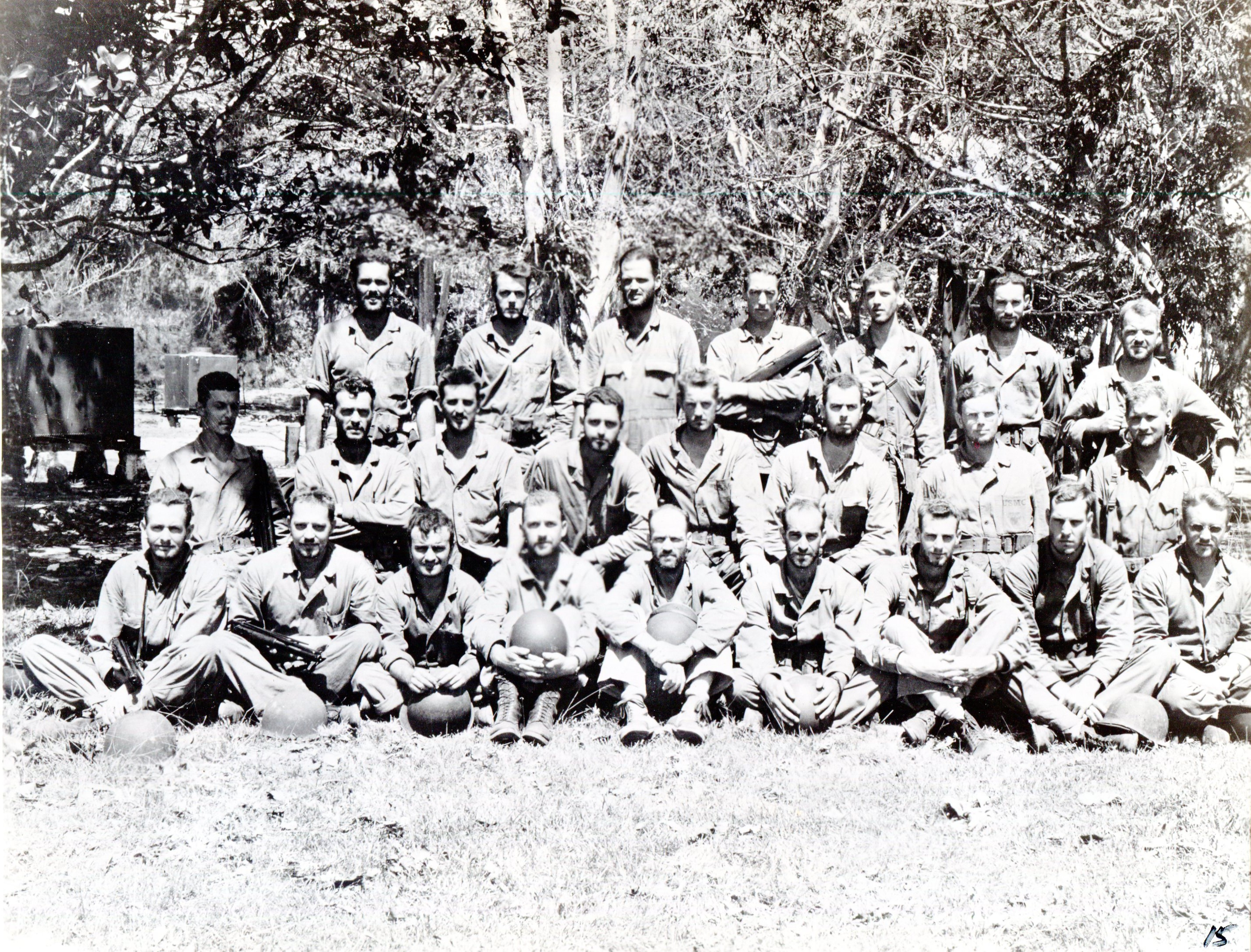
U.S. Marine Corps officers on Tulagi Island, Solomon Islands, August 1942

On August 7, 1942 U.S. Marines landed on Guadalcanal, beginning the Guadalcanal Campaign, and were subsequently engaged in heavy fighting against Japanese troops. Throughout the months-long battle for Guadalcanal, both sides attempted to reinforce and resupply their forces by sea. The Allies created a cross-service air unit based on Guadalcanal, known as the Cactus Air Force, (Note: "Cactus" was the code name for Henderson Field on Guadalcanal) and eventually established air superiority over the Guadalcanal area during daylight hours. After incurring heavy losses during daylight reinforcement attempts, the Japanese resorted to nightly resupply missions which they called "Rat Transportation" (and the Allies called "the Tokyo Express") through New Georgia Sound (a.k.a. "The Slot"). The Allies fought large naval engagements from August 1942 to February 1943 in an attempt to degrade Japan's ability to resupply its troops on Guadalcanal. So many ships were lost by both sides during these battles that the southern end of New Georgia Sound, the area north of Guadalcanal previously called Savo Sound, became known as "Ironbottom Sound".

The Allies gradually obtained naval and aerial superiority over the Guadalcanal area, finally compelling the Japanese to evacuate their remaining troops from the island in early 1943.

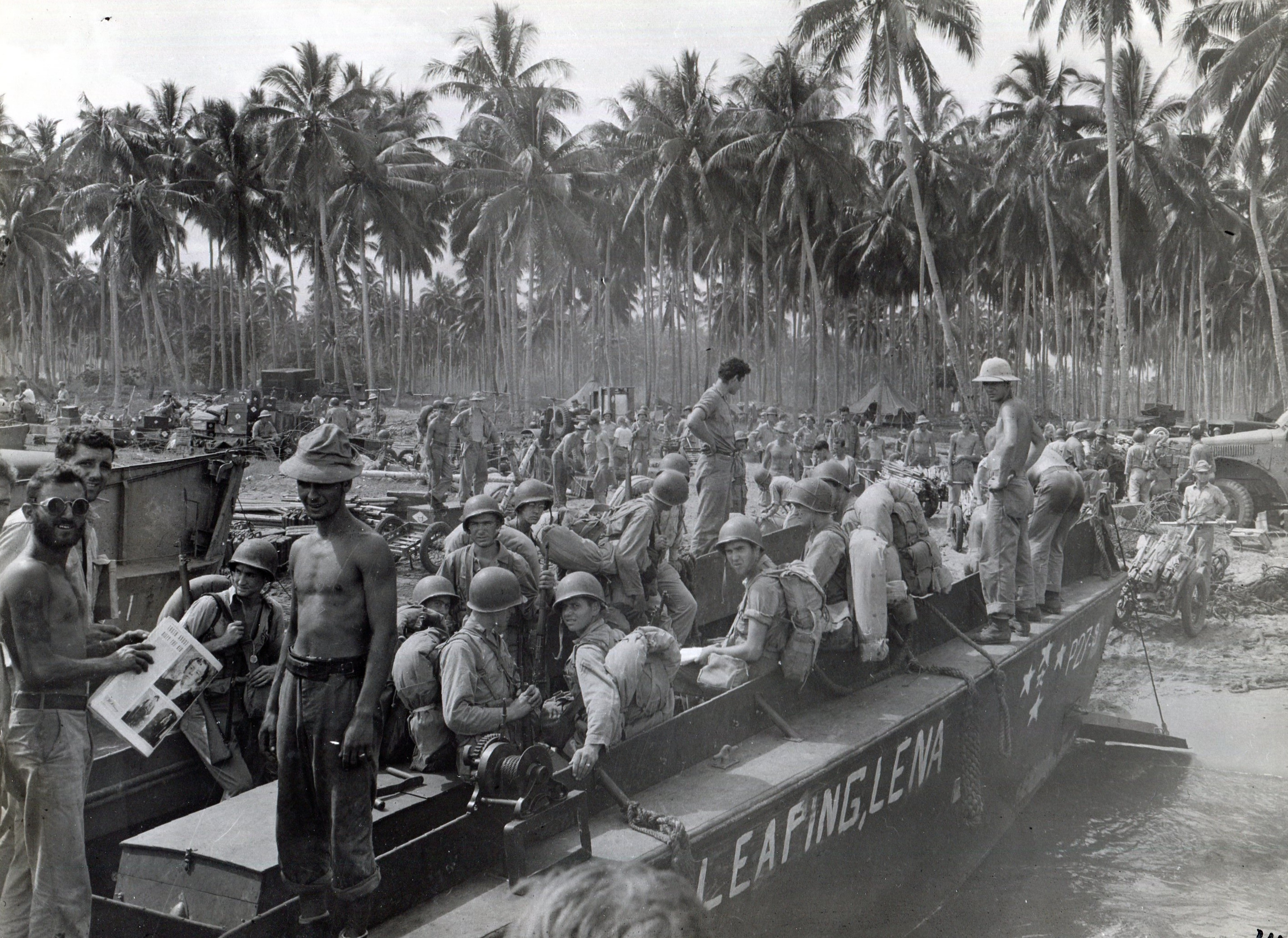
Marines prepare to leave Guadalcanal after months of fighting, circa 1942

Allied success in the Solomon Islands campaign prevented the Japanese from cutting Australia and New Zealand off from the United States. Operation Cartwheel—the Allied grand strategy for the Solomons and New Guinea campaigns—launched on June 30, 1943, isolated and neutralized Rabaul and destroyed much of Japan's sea and air supremacy. This opened the way for Allied forces to recapture the Philippines and cut off Japan from its crucial resource areas in the Netherlands East Indies.

The Solomons campaign culminated in the often bitter fighting of the Bougainville campaign, which continued until the end of the war.

During the leadup to the Bougainville campaign, on August 2, 1943, while attempting to intercept Japanese Tokyo Express transport ships, Lieutenant Junior Grade (later president) John F. Kennedy was in command of patrol torpedo boat PT-109 when it was rammed and sunk by the Japanese destroyer Amagiri. Kennedy and ten of his crew were able to swim to an uninhabited island and were eventually rescued by US forces operating from Rendova Island.

== See also ==
- New Guinea campaign
- New Britain campaign
- Gilbert and Marshall Islands campaign
- Guadalcanal Campaign
- Operation Vengeance
- AirSols
- Battle of the Coral Sea
- Battle of the Treasury Islands

== Sources ==
- Altobello, Brian (2000). Into the Shadows Furious. Presidio Press. ISBN 0-89141-717-6. Archived from the original on May 24, 2024.
- Bergerud, Eric M. (1997). Touched with Fire : The Land War in the South Pacific. Penguin. ISBN 0-14-024696-7. Archived from the original on May 24, 2024.
- Bergerud, Eric M. (2000). Fire in the Sky: The Air War in the South Pacific. Boulder, CO, USA: Westview Press. ISBN 0-8133-3869-7.
- Brown, David (1990). Warship Losses of World War Two. Naval Institute Press. ISBN 1-55750-914-X. Archived from the original on May 24, 2024.
- D'Albas, Andrieu (1965). Death of a Navy: Japanese Naval Action in World War II. Devin-Adair Pub. ISBN 0-8159-5302-X. Archived from the original on May 24, 2024.
- Drea, Edward J. (1998). "An Allied Interpretation of the Pacific War". In the Service of the Emperor: Essays on the Imperial Japanese Army. Nebraska: University of Nebraska Press. ISBN 0-8032-1708-0.
- Dull, Paul S. (1978). A Battle History of the Imperial Japanese Navy, 1941-1945. Naval Institute Press. ISBN 0-87021-097-1.
- Frank, Richard (1990). Guadalcanal: The Definitive Account of the Landmark Battle. New York: Random House. ISBN 0-394-58875-4.
- Gailey, Harry A. (1991). Bougainville, 1943-1945: The Forgotten Campaign. Lexington, Kentucky, USA: University Press of Kentucky. ISBN 0-8131-9047-9. Archived from the original on May 24, 2024.
- Griffith, Brig. Gen. Samuel B (USMC) (1974). "Part 96: Battle For the Solomons". History of the Second World War. Hicksville, NY, USA: BPC Publishing.
- Hoyt, Edwin P. (1990). Glory Of The Solomons (Reissue ed.). Jove. ISBN 0-515-10450-7.
- Kilpatrick, C. W. (1987). Naval Night Battles of the Solomons. Exposition Press. ISBN 0-682-40333-4.
- Long, Gavin (1963). Volume VII – The Final Campaigns. Australia in the War of 1939–1945. Canberra: Australian War Memorial. Archived from the original on August 27, 2006.
- Lord, Walter (2006) [1977]. Lonely Vigil; Coastwatchers of the Solomons. Naval Institute Press. ISBN 1-59114-466-3. Archived from the original on May 24, 2024.
- McCarthy, Dudley (1959). Volume V – South–West Pacific Area – First Year: Kokoda to Wau. Australia in the War of 1939–1945. Canberra: Australian War Memorial. Archived from the original on August 27, 2006.
- McGee, William L. (2002). The Solomons Campaigns, 1942–1943: From Guadalcanal to Bougainville—Pacific War Turning Point, Volume 2 (Amphibious Operations in the South Pacific in WWII). BMC Publications. ISBN 0-9701678-7-3.
- Morison, Samuel Eliot (1958). The Struggle for Guadalcanal, August 1942 – February 1943, vol. 5 of History of United States Naval Operations in World War II. Boston: Little, Brown and Company. ISBN 0-316-58305-7.
- Morison, Samuel Eliot (1958). Breaking the Bismarcks Barrier, vol. 6 of History of United States Naval Operations in World War II. Castle Books. ISBN 0-7858-1307-1. on Google Books Archived May 24, 2024, at the Wayback Machine
- Murray, Williamson; Allan R. Millett (2001). A War To Be Won: Fighting the Second World War. United States of America: Belknap Press. ISBN 0-674-00680-1.
- Odgers, George (1968). Volume II – Air War Against Japan, 1943–1945. Australia in the War of 1939–1945. Canberra: Australian War Memorial. Archived from the original on August 27, 2006.
- Okumiya, Masatake; Jiro Horikoshi; with Martin Caiden (1956). Zero!. New York: E. P. Duton & Co.
- Spector, Ronald H. (1985). Eagle Against the Sun. The MacMillan Wars of the United States. New York: MacMillan, Inc. ISBN 0-02-930360-5.
- Toll, Ian W. (2015). The Conquering Tide: War in the Pacific Islands, 1942–1944. New York: W. W. Norton.
