= Bill Sweeting =

Australian historian and museum administrator

Alan John Sweeting, MBE (3 November 1918 – 9 July 2016), known as Bill Sweeting, was an Australian historian and museum administrator.

== Career ==
Sweeting was born in Penrith, New South Wales on 3 November 1918.

Sweeting joined the Second Australian Imperial Force (2nd AIF) on 23 July 1940 and was posted to the 2/4th Field Ambulance. He served with the medical unit in the Middle East during 1941, and returned to Australia with it February 1942. From July of that year he and the 2/4th Field Ambulance took part in the Kokoda Track campaign.

In April 1944 Sweeting was appointed confidential clerk to official historian Gavin Long. He eventually reached the rank of sergeant and, after the war had ended, he was discharged from the 2nd AIF on 12 November 1945.

After leaving the army, Sweeting continued to work for Long as a research assistant on the official history series Australia in the War of 1939–1945. He also authored three chapters in one of the volumes, covering the experiences of Australian prisoners of war held by Japan. After Long retired in 1963, Sweeting became the acting editor of the official history series, and remained in this role until 1970 when the last volume was published.

In 1967 Sweeting was appointed the Assistant Director of the Australian War Memorial (AWM). Sweeting was appointed a Member of the Order of the British Empire in June 1977 for his public service. At this time he was the Public Assistant Director, Board of Trustees at the AWM. Sweeting retired from the AWM in March 1979; his final position there was Assistant Director, History and Publications.

In the mid-1980s Sweeting was a member of a Returned and Services League of Australia committee that monitored the AWM.
