= Arthur Butler (historian) =

Australian soldier and military historian

Arthur Graham Butler
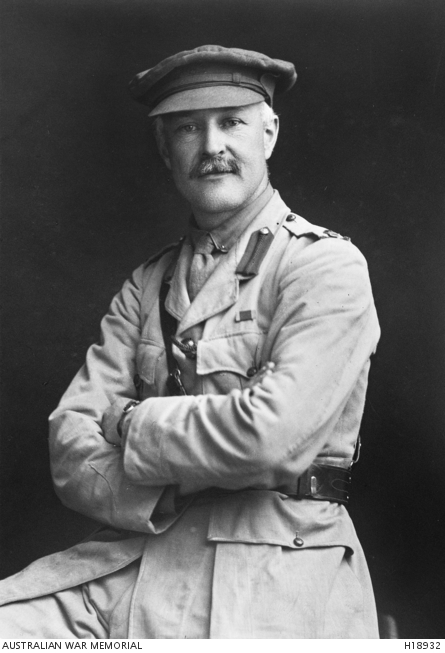
- Arthur Butler, when a major in the Australian Army Medical Corps, 1916
- Born: 25 May 1872; Kilcoy, Queensland, Australia
- Died: 27 February 1949 (aged 76); Canberra, Australian Capital Territory, Australia

Academic work
- Main interests: Australian military history First World War
- Notable works: Official History of the Australian Army Medical Services, 1914–1918
- Military career
- Branch: Australian Army
- Service years: 1912–1920
- Rank: Colonel
- Unit: 9th Battalion
- Commands: 3rd Australian General Hospital; 3rd Field Ambulance
- Conflicts: First World War; Gallipoli campaign; Western Front
- Awards: Distinguished Service Order; Mentioned in Despatches (2)

Arthur Graham Butler DSO, ED (25 May 1872 – 27 February 1949) was an Australian soldier and military historian, and a prominent middle-distance runner in England as a student. He was the main author of the Official History of the Australian Army Medical Services, 1914–1918, part of the Official History of Australia in the War of 1914–1918.

Born in Queensland, after Butler finished his schooling he obtained degrees in medicine and surgery from Cambridge University. He was working as a general practitioner in Brisbane when the First World War broke out and immediately joined the Australian Imperial Force. Posted to the 9th Battalion as a regimental medical officer, he served at Gallipoli and on the Western Front. He ended the war as commander of the 3rd Australian General Hospital in Abbeville. On his return to Australia, he was asked to write the official history of the Australian Army medical services, a task that took 20 years to complete and resulted in the three volume Official History of the Australian Army Medical Services, 1914–1918. Troubled by partial blindness in his later years, he died in Canberra at the age of 76.

== Early life ==
Arthur Graham Butler was born in Kilcoy, in Queensland, Australia, on 25 May 1872 to William Butler and his wife June née Graham. His parents were both English emigrants, and his father was working as a station manager at the time of his birth. He was educated at Ipswich Grammar School before going to England to study medicine at Cambridge University.

Butler was in the 1890s also a prominent middle-distance runner in England. In 1896, he defeated British middle-distance champions William King and Edgar Bredin and was regarded by the end of the season as possibly the best runner in Britain. He ran the half-mile in under two minutes, with times surpassing those recorded by Edwin Flack at the 1896 Summer Olympics. Butler was unable to compete in the British championships that year because of a sprained ankle, and instead concentrated on his medical studies at Cambridge University.

After Butler obtained degrees in medicine and in surgery, he then returned to Kilcoy to work as a general practitioner. In 1902, Butlet shifted his practice to Gladstone and two years later, married Lilian Kate Mills; the couple had a daughter. After several years at Gladstone, Butler undertook postgraduate studies at the University of Sydney after which he practiced medicine in Brisbane.

== First World War ==
On the outbreak of the First World War, Butler enlisted in the Australian Imperial Force (AIF). He was already experienced in military matters, having joined the Australian Army Medical Corps in 1912, serving as a medical officer in the Citizen Military Forces with the Moreton Regiment. He was appointed the medical officer, with the rank of captain, for the 9th Battalion.

Butler was among the first Australians ashore at Gallipoli on 25 April, landing at ANZAC Cove under machine gun fire. While he was treating wounded soldiers on the beach, he noted several Australians shooting up the slopes from the cover of a bank. He encouraged them forward, leading a party up the slopes. Moving inland, he set up a medical post between 400 Plateau and Bolton's Ridge, treating the wounded and rallying troops. He remained on the Gallipoli peninsula until October, receiving a promotion to major during this time. Earlier in the year, for his services at Gallipoli, he was awarded the Distinguished Service Order (DSO), “for gallantry and devotion to duty”.

In February 1916, in Egypt, Butler was appointed Deputy Assistant Director of Medical Services for the I ANZAC Corps and several months later was deployed to the Western Front. He was promoted to lieutenant colonel in November 1916. In February 1917, Butler became commander of the 3rd Field Ambulance, and was present for the battles at Bullecourt and Passchendaele. During this period, he was twice mentioned in despatches. In November, much to his displeasure since he preferred to remain at the front, he was sent to London to organise the AIF's medical records there. In the middle of the following year, he returned to France as a temporary colonel and commander of the 3rd Australian General Hospital, based at Abbeville. He remained in this role until the hospital closed in June 1919. He was discharged from the AIF in February 1920 having spent the previous several months in the Australian War Records Section at the headquarters of the AIF in London. His rank of colonel had been made substantive by the time of his departure from the AIF.

== Postwar period ==
On his return to civilian life, Butler resumed his medical practice in Brisbane. However, he was soon asked to prepare the official history of the Australian Army medical services of the First World War. It was a task that was envisaged as a single volume, to be completed in around two years, but would ultimately end up being a three volume series taking 20 years to complete. He commenced work in November 1922, based in Melbourne, and then relocating to Canberra a few years later. He took a meticulous approach to his work, and often missed deadlines, which at times frustrated Charles Bean, who was co-ordinating the production of the Australian official histories. He was not helped by the Australian Government's refusal to fund a full-time assistant for his work.

The first volume, covering the campaigns in Gallipoli, Palestine and New Guinea, was published in 1930; Butler wrote the chapters dealing with Gallipoli, while Rupert Downes authored those relating to Palestine and F. A. Maguire that covering New Guinea. The second volume, dealing with the Western Front, appeared in 1940, and the last, concerning problems and services, was published in 1943. He was the sole author of the last two volumes. His work was highly regarded and he dealt with topics, such as shell-shock and self-inflicted wounds, that Bean was unable or uncomfortable to in his own published works on the First World War. A target readership was military medical staff, with the clinical information contained in the books helping educate them in treatment methods. By the time of the publication of the books, current knowledge and understanding of medicine rendered much of the learnings from Butler's work redundant. None of the books sold well and several were provided to the public as presentation copies.

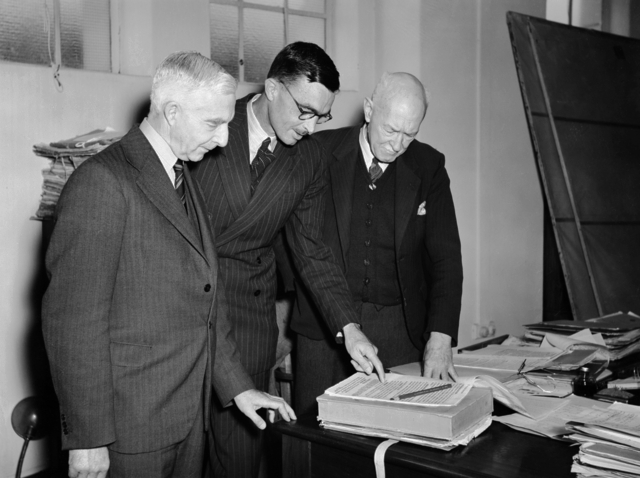
Arthur Butler (right) and fellow military historians, Gavin Long (centre) and Allan S. Walker (left), discuss a manuscript in the Australian War Memorial library in 1945

== Later life ==
Butler worked at the library of the Australian War Memorial (AWM) from 1945 to 1947, classifying medical documents. Despite suffering partial blindness, which had affected his later work on the official histories, Butler continued to write, publishing The Digger: A Study in Democracy in 1945. He had previously been a co-author of National Roses of Canberra, the flower being a passion of his.

He died on 27 February 1949, suffering from hypertensive cerebral vascular disease. Buried at St John the Baptist Church in Canberra, where he was part of the congregation, he was survived by his wife and daughter. His papers were donated to the AWM. He himself had donated many items, including personal documents dating from his war service, to the organisation's library in the years leading up to his death. His medals, including the DSO, 1914–15 Star, British War Medal, Victory Medal with bronze oak leaf and Colonial Auxiliary Forces Officers' Decoration, are held by the AWM.
