= John Herington =

British-born Australian military historian and airman

- Born: 3 June 1916; Coventry, United Kingdom
- Died: 22 January 1967 (aged 50); St Marylebone, London
- Burial place: St John the Evangelist, Glen Iris, Melbourne
- Military career
- Allegiance: United Kingdom
- Branch: Royal Australian Air Force
- Rank: Squadron Leader
- Conflicts: Second World War
- Other work: Official war historian

John Herington (3 June 1916 – 22 January 1967) was a British-born Australian military historian and officer in the Royal Australian Air Force (RAAF). He served during the Second World War as a pilot with Coastal Command and as an intelligence officer. He authored two of the volumes of the official history series Australia in the War of 1939–1945, dealing with the role of the RAAF in the conflict. He later worked for the Department of Supply, working in South Australia and in London, where he died of cancer in 1967.

== Early life ==
John Herington was born in Coventry, England on 3 June 1916. One of five children, both his parents died when Herington was still a child and he was cared for by guardians. He was educated at Bablake School in Coventry before going on to study at Downing College in University of Cambridge. He gained a Bachelor of Arts in 1937 and under the tutelage of Admiral Sir Herbert Richmond, enhanced his interest in military history. However, inspired by the work of Kingsley Fairbridge, he trained in social work and gained practical experience in London. He emigrated to Australia in 1938 and worked at the schools established by Fairbridge.

== Second World War ==
Herington joined the Royal Australian Air Force (RAAF) in February 1941. He trained in the Empire Air Training Scheme, becoming a pilot after time at military flying schools in Australia and then Canada. Top ranked in his class and, commissioned as a pilot officer, he was sent to England to serve with the Royal Air Force. Posted to No. 202 Squadron, a Coastal Command unit based in Gibraltar and equipped with the Consolidated Catalina seaplane, Herington flew long range anti-submarine patrols into the Atlantic and in the western Mediterranean. After nearly a year with the squadron, he was posted away to Northern Ireland to carry out instructing duties at No. 131 Operational Training Unit. He was seriously injured on 24 May 1943, when his Catalina crashed into a lake.

After several months of recovery, Herington returned to active duty in March 1944 with a posting as an intelligence officer to the RAAF's No.10 Squadron, which was based in Devon. The following month, he married Freda Robson; they had met during the period Herington was being treated for the injuries incurred during his aircraft accident. In early 1945, by which time he held the rank of squadron leader, he was assigned to the RAAF's Overseas Headquarters in London, with responsibility for the historical records section. He worked on the preparation of initial histories of the role of the Australian squadrons in the various Commands of the RAF, based on their war diaries.

== Official Histories ==
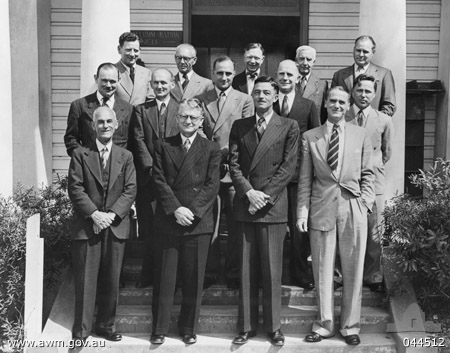
A group photo of the authors of Australia in the War of 1939–1945. Herington stands second right in the middle row

Thought had been given to the production of an official history of Australia's efforts in the Second World War as early as 1943, when Gavin Long was appointed to lead the publishing project, that became Australia in the War of 1939–1945. He intended a series of volumes covering the work of the various services of Australia's military, and their campaigns in Europe, Africa and Asia. Long, aware of Herington's work in London, invited him to be involved in the writing of a volume relating to the contributions of the RAAF in Europe. Herington returned in Australia in 1947 and began full time work on the book the following year, when he was released from the RAAF. As his work progressed, it became apparent that the proposed book could be split into two separate volumes, one covering the period from 1939 up until 1943, and a second covering the balance of the war years. Herington's proposal to do this was approved.

Herington rejoined the RAAF in 1951 and, holding the rank of squadron leader, served as an intelligence officer in Melbourne, while still preparing his first volume. He was seconded to the Department of Supply from 1953 to 1954, with responsibility for security during the preparations for the atom bomb tests that were carried out in South Australia during this period. Herington's Air War Against Germany and Italy 1939-1943, was published in 1954. Although intended to be the third in the series of volumes dedicated to the Australian war effort in the air, it was actually the first to be published. Herington's work was well received; one reviewer described the book as "an impressive, scholarly work".

After resigning from the RAAF the same year his first book was published, Herington took up a permanent role with the Department of Supply as regional security officer for South Australia. He continued to work on his second volume of the official history, and this was published in 1963 as Air Power Over Europe 1944–1945. His work was again favourably received, with the latest volume assessed by one contemporary commentator as "calm and scholarly".

== Later life ==
In 1965, Herington was sent to London as the senior representative for the Department of Supply there. Hospitalised at St Marylebone with cancer, he died on 22 January 1967. Survived by his wife and seven children, he was cremated and his ashes buried in Melbourne, in the churchyard of St John the Evangelist in Glen Iris.
