= George Odgers =

Australian soldier, journalist and military historian

George James Odgers
- George Odgers in 1954
- Born: 29 March 1916; Perth, Western Australia
- Died: 2008 (aged 91–92)
- Occupations: Soldier, journalist and historian
- Known for: Military histories

George James Odgers (29 March 1916 – 2008) was an Australian soldier, journalist and military historian. Odgers served in the Australian Army as a private soldier and non-commissioned officer; and later in the Royal Australian Air Force becoming a group captain. He was one of the authors of the official history of Australia in World War II, Australia in the War of 1939–1945.

== Early years ==
Odgers was born in Perth, Western Australia, on 29 March 1916. He was the youngest of eight children and the first of his parents' children to be born in a hospital. The family struggled financially through the Great Depression, but Odgers was able to attend Perth Boys High School and later worked his way through the University of Western Australia and University of Melbourne where he completed a master of arts.

After completing university Odgers started working at the Melbourne Argus in 1940. He left the newspaper to enlist in the Royal Australian Air Force (RAAF) later that year. After completing some air crew training he was ruled out of flying duties on medical grounds and instead joined the Army's Australian Imperial Force. As a member of the Army he served in the New Guinea and Borneo Campaigns, reaching the rank of sergeant. Following the war Odgers was successful in joining the RAAF and spent time with Australian forces during the Korean War, Malayan Emergency and Vietnam War, eventually rising to the rank of group captain. During his time in the Air Force he was a member of the RAAF War History Section.

== Military historian and journalist ==
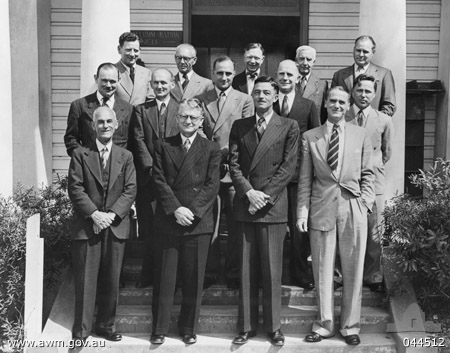
Odgers (second row, third from the left) with the other authors of Australia in the War of 1939–1945 in 1954

Shortly after the end of the war Gavin Long selected George Odgers to be one of the authors of the air series of Australia in the War of 1939–1945, starting his career as a military historian. Odgers' first book was a history of No. 77 Squadron RAAF in the Korean War entitled Across the Parallel, which was published in 1952. His volume of the official history, Air War Against Japan 1943–1945, was published in 1957 and covered the RAAF's operations in the Pacific War from 1943 onwards. The official history was followed by The Royal Australian Air Force (1965), The Golden Years (1971) and Mission Vietnam (1974). All of these works were guided by his experiences in the RAAF and successfully appealed to a popular audience "without sacrificing either detail or rigour".

Odgers worked as a defence journalist in parallel with his career as a military historian. After the Argus closed in 1956 he was hired by the fledgling television station GTV-9 and worked in its news production team. He moved to The Age in 1960 as a special writer focusing on defence issues. Odgers married Elizabeth Garrod in 1954 and the couple had two children.

In 1965 Odgers became the head of public relations for the Department of Air and subsequently the RAAF. He held this position until 1975 when he became Director of Historical Studies and Information in the Department of Defence.

Odgers retired from the Department of Defence in 1981 but continued working as a historian. He published illustrated histories of the Royal Australian Navy, Air Force and Army in 1982, 1984 and 1988 respectively. His two volume history of Australia's involvement in 11 wars, Diggers, was published in 1994. His last work was a biography of Wing Commander Dick Cresswell, Mr Double Seven, which found a publisher shortly before his death in early 2008 at the age of 91. Odgers was the last living member of the 14 historians who wrote Australia in the War of 1939–1945 and was survived by two of his siblings, his wife and sons and their five grandchildren.
