= Lionel Wigmore =

Australian journalist and military historian

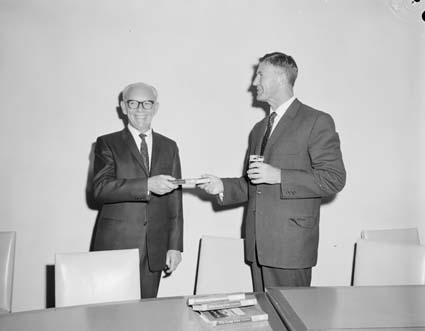
- Wigmore (left), presents a copy of his book, A History of Canberra, to the Minister for the Interior, Gordon Freeth (right)
- Born: Lionel Gage Wigmore; 14 March 1899; Brockhampton, Herefordshire, England
- Died: 8 November 1989 (aged 90); Hobart, Tasmania, Australia

Academic work
- Main interests: Australian regional history Australian military history Second World War
- Notable works: Volume IV of Australia in the War of 1939–1945

Lionel Gage Wigmore (14 March 1899 – 8 November 1989) was an English-born Australian journalist and military historian. He was an author of a number of books on aspects of Australian history, including one of the volumes of the official history series Australia in the War of 1939–1945.

== Early life ==
Lionel Wigmore was born in Brockhampton, Herefordshire, in England on 14 March 1899 to Charles Wigmore, a farmer, and his wife Arabella née Fewtrell. When Wigmore was 10 years old, the family emigrated to New Zealand, where they settled in Christchurch. He attended the Normal District High School and after he finished his schooling in 1915, he found employment at The Press, a Christchurch newspaper. He later worked at the Lyttelton Times. In 1918, he enlisted in the New Zealand Expeditionary Force for service in the First World War. However, the fighting ended before he embarked overseas.

== Australia ==
In 1922 Wigmore moved to Australia, settling in Sydney. For the next several years, he worked for The Daily Telegraph and The Sun. At various times he reported on motoring, aviation and political matters before moving into sub-editing. For a three-year period, from 1928 to 1931, he was a publicist for the petroleum industry and was a magazine editor. He also served in the Australian Citizen Force, the country's part-time militia, as a lieutenant in the Army Service Corps. In 1939, he began working for the Australian Government, at the Federal Department of Information.

== Second World War ==
By April 1941, Wigmore was based in Singapore where there was an Australian military presence. Working with other information agencies in the area, particularly the Far Eastern Bureau of the British Ministry of Information, he kept the troops in Malaya informed of news from Australia. In his role, he clashed with the senior Australian officer in Malaya, Major General Gordon Bennett, the commander of the Australian 8th Division. In February 1942, with the Japanese having pushed the British and Allied forces in Malaya back to Singapore Island, Wigmore was evacuated to Java. He served briefly as an assistant Australian government commissioner, working to arrange supplies to be sent to Australia from Netherlands East Indies, before it, like Singapore, was captured by the Japanese. By this time, Wigmore was back in Australia and working out of the Department of Information's Melbourne office.

In 1944, Wigmore was appointed chief administration officer, based out of Canberra, and then the following year was sent to India. He was attached to the Australian High Commissioner's office as a public relations officer. He returned to Canberra in 1947 as a representative to the United Nations Educational, Scientific and Cultural Organization.

== Official History ==
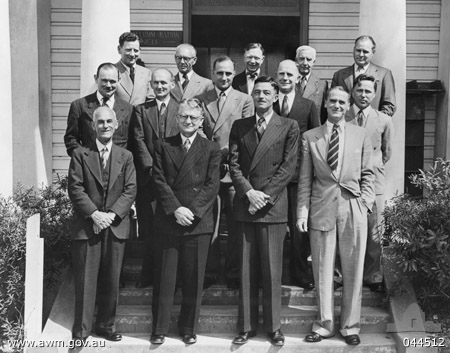
A group photo of the authors of Australia in the War of 1939–1945 in 1954. Wigmore stands second left in the back row

In 1943, the Australian Government selected Gavin Long as general editor of the Australia in the War of 1939–1945. This was to be a 22-volume official history of Australia's involvement in the Second World War. He progressed the project for the next several years, planning various volumes and identifying potential authors. In 1948, Long selected Wigmore as the author of the volume concerning the Australian Army's effort in British Malaya after his original choice had dropped out.

The volume, titled The Japanese Thrust, would prove to be a difficult work to write. There were disagreements with Stanley Kirby, the author of the British official history on the war with Japan about the analysis of events in Singapore. Wigmore also had to deal with attempts by a member of the Australian Government, Wilfrid Kent Hughes, who was a prominent former officer in the 8th Division, to influence his treatment of Gordon Bennett's leadership of the division in Singapore. Bennett himself tried to sway the coverage of his command. Wigmore already had an acrimonious relationship with Bennett from his own time in Singapore and this worsened with allegations from Bennett of bias and inaccuracy. By request of the British Government, publication of the book was delayed until 1957, by which time Malayan independence had been granted. The public reception to The Japanese Thrust was favourable and it reviewed well.

== Later life ==
With his book complete, Wigmore returned to the renamed Australian News and Information Bureau (ANIB). He was again based in India, and retired in 1962. He continued to write and was a co-author with Bruce Harding of They Dared Mightily, an account of the Australian Victoria Cross recipients, published in 1963. This work was followed by histories of Canberra and the Snowy Mountains Scheme, a hydroelectric facility in southern New South Wales. He later moved to Hobart in Tasmania, where he died on 8 November 1989, at the age of 90. He was survived by his wife Emily, who he had married in 1926, and a daughter. His papers are held by the National Library of Australia.
