= David Dexter =

Australian commando and diplomat (1917–1992)

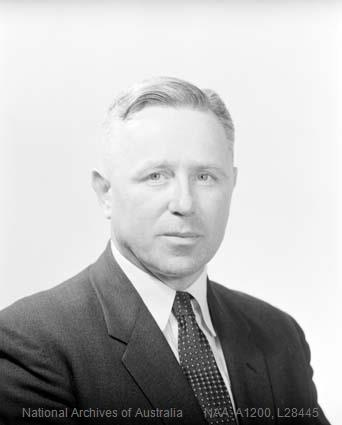
- 1958 portrait
- Born: 8 January 1917; St Albans, Hertfordshire, England
- Died: 15 March 1992 (aged 75); Canberra, Australian Capital Territory

Academic work
- Main interests: Australian military history Second World War
- Notable works: Volume VI of Australia in the War of 1939–1945
- Military career
- Branch: Australian Army
- Service years: 1940–1946
- Rank: Major
- Service number: VX38890
- Commands: 2/4th Commando Squadron
- Conflicts: Second World War; Battle of Timor; New Guinea campaign; New Britain campaign; Battle of Tarakan
- Awards: mentioned in despatches (2)

David St Alban Dexter (8 January 1917 – 15 March 1992) was an Australian military historian, commando, diplomat and university administrator.

A 1940 graduate of the University of Melbourne, Dexter enlisted in the Second Australian Imperial Force in 1940. He volunteered for commando training. He was commissioned as a lieutenant and transferred to the 2/2nd Independent Company. The 2/2nd Independent Company was sent to Portuguese Timor, where it waged a guerrilla war against the Japanese after they invaded the island in February 1942. He returned to Australia with the unit in December. In June 1943 it was sent to New Guinea, where Dexter was wounded while carrying out an ambush on a Japanese force. In 1945, it went to New Britain. Shortly before the end of the war in August 1945, he assumed command of the 2/4th Commando Squadron with the rank of major. He later wrote the New Guinea volume of the Australia in the War of 1939–1945 series.

After the war, Dexter joined the Department of External Affairs. He worked closely with the Minister for External Affairs, H. V. Evatt, accompanying him to the second and third sessions of the United Nations General Assembly in 1947 and 1948, and helping him become the President of the United Nations General Assembly. As the head of the department's foreign aid branch, he was involved in the formulation of the Colombo Plan and developed foreign aid programs in conjunction with the South East Asia Treaty Organization and the United Nations. He became the secretary of the Australian Universities Commission in 1960, and then the Registrar (Property and Plans) at the Australian National University (ANU) in 1967.

== Early life ==
David St Alban Dexter was born on 8 January 1917 at St Albans, Hertfordshire, England, the second of five sons and one daughter of Colonel Walter Ernest Dexter, and his wife Dora Stirling, née Roadknight. His father was on active service at the time as an Army Church of England chaplain with the First Australian Imperial Force (AIF). The family returned to Australia in 1920, where his father's AIF appointment was terminated. His father decided to become a farmer, and he took up a soldier settlement block near Kilsyth, Victoria.

Like so many others, Dexter's father's farming venture was a failure. He then returned to the church in 1923, and the family moved to a clergy house in Romsey, Victoria. In 1927, they relocated to the parish of Lara, Victoria. Dexter and his four brothers all attended Geelong Grammar, an exclusive private school. Dexter was there from 1930 to 1935, initially as a boarder on a scholarship for sons of the clergy, but as a day student in his final years. He played Australian football and cricket, served in the school cadet unit, and was a prefect. His contemporaries at Geelong Grammar included Dick Hamer and his brother Alan, David Hay and David Fairbairn; John Gorton was a friend of his brother.

After matriculating from Geelong Grammar, Dexter took a job in a furniture business run by Maurice Arnold Nathan. He lasted a year but after a series of mishaps he decided that this was not his line of work, and he resolved to go to university. He accepted an appointment as a student teacher at Grimwade House at Melbourne Grammar, which he did while he studied French and history at the University of Melbourne part-time. He also played football for the Melbourne University Football Club. Max Crawford persuaded him to do honours, so he did this year full-time. He was able to live with his parents, as his father had taken up the parish in Footscray, Victoria. He received his Bachelor of Arts degree with honours in 1940.

== Second World War ==
Dexter joined the Second Australian Imperial Force on 8 October 1940, and was assigned the service number VX38890. He was posted to the 2/21st Infantry Battalion, which was training at Bonegilla, Victoria, on 19 October. This was part of the 23rd Brigade of the 7th Division. The 23rd Brigade was later transferred to the 8th Division. After a chance meeting with Major Freddie Spencer Chapman and Major Mike Calvert in a Melbourne pub, Dexter volunteered for commando training. He became a sergeant on 7 March 1941. He was commissioned as a lieutenant and transferred to the 2/2nd Independent Company at Wilsons Promontory on 11 July. He assumed command of 1 Section, A Platoon.

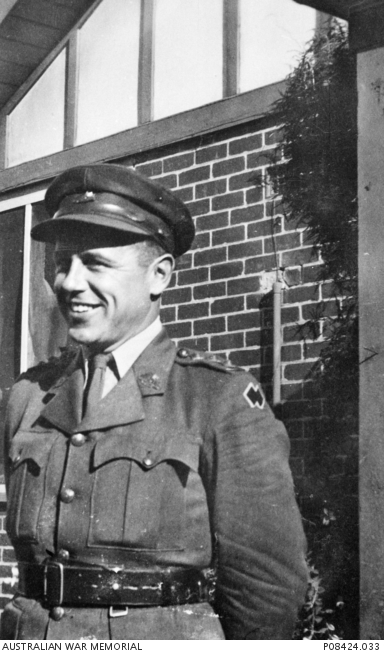
Dexter in 1943

In October 1941, the 2/2nd Independent Company moved by train to Adelaide, and then, in January 1942, to Darwin. On 17 February 1942, with Japan now in the war, it embarked for Koepang on the SS Zealandia as part of Sparrow Force. It then moved to Dili in Portuguese Timor on the Dutch ship, HNLMS Soerabaja. The Japanese landed in East Timor on the night of 19–20 February, and the 2/2nd Independent Company retreated into the hills, where it waged guerrilla warfare against the Japanese. Back in Australia, Dexter was reported missing, but contact with East Timor was restored in June, and his family was informed that he was alive and well. The 2/2nd Independent Company was relieved by the 2/4th Independent Company. Dexter, who was promoted to the temporary rank of captain on 4 July, and the substantive rank on 1 September, became the commander of A Platoon. The 2/2nd Independent Company was taken off by the Dutch destroyer HNLMS Tjerk Hiddes, and he returned to Darwin on 17 December. He was mentioned in despatches for his service on East Timor.

After hospital treatment for malaria, Dexter was seconded to the Allied Geographical Section in Brisbane on 8 January 1943 to help it prepare a terrain study of East Timor. He rejoined the 2/2nd Independent Company at Canungra on 8 March, and on 16 June it embarked from Townsville on the MV Duntroon, and sailed to Port Moresby. From there it was flown to Bena Bena in the highlands, where it patrolled and conducted raids and ambushes. On 28 September, Dexter led a heavily armed patrol that ambushed about 60 Japanese soldiers near Kesawai in the Ramu Valley, inflicting severe casualties on the Japanese, and was wounded in this action. He was mentioned in despatches again for his service in New Guinea. Dexter returned to Australia on 2 March 1944, and was seconded to Z Special Unit in Melbourne on 22 April 1944. That month he became engaged to Freda Doris Irene Harper, a teacher, and they were married at St Mark's Church in Camberwell, Victoria, where his father was the minister, on 29 September. They would have five children together.

He rejoined his unit, now styled the 2/2nd Commando Squadron, on 1 December 1944. He was now the second in command. On 9 April 1945, the 2/2nd Commando Squadron embarked from Brisbane for New Britain. On 12 June 1945, he was appointed the commander of the 2/7th Commando Squadron with the rank of major. Before taking up his command he attended a tactical school course from 17 June to 29 July. The instructors were impressed with his confident bearing, but felt that his experience outside the commandos was limited, and that he required more experience in handling supporting arms. His assignment was changed to command of the 2/4th Commando Squadron on Tarakan in Borneo, and he assumed command on 2 August. The war ended soon after, and he embarked for Australia on the Victory ship SS Stamford Victory on 6 December. His AIF appointment was terminated on 17 January 1946, and he was transferred to the Reserve of Officers. He was placed on the retired list on 29 February 1964.

== Post-war ==
Dexter received an invitation to join the Department of External Affairs in Canberra from the departmental secretary, William Dunk. He worked closely with the Minister for External Affairs, H. V. Evatt, accompanying him to the second and third sessions of the United Nations General Assembly in 1947 and 1948, and helping him become the President of the United Nations General Assembly. Dexter dealt with important issues of the day like the establishment of the State of Israel and the Berlin airlift.

In 1955 Dexter became the head of the department's foreign aid branch. As such, he worked closely with the new minister, Richard Casey. He was involved in the formulation of the Colombo Plan and developed foreign aid programs in conjunction with the South East Asia Treaty Organization and the United Nations. In 1946 Dexter had accepted a commission from the official historian of the Second World War at the Australian War Memorial, Gavin Long, to write the New Guinea volume of the Australia in the War of 1939–1945 series. Dexter consciously copied the methods of Charles Bean, the historian of the Great War, assembling documents in chronological order into six master diaries. Most of Dexter's volume The New Guinea Offensives was based on the unit war diaries. He wrote most of it while he was the first secretary of the Australian High Commission to Ceylon in Colombo, where he served under Roden Cutler from 1952 to 1955. In 1959 he became a counsellor to the Australian High Commissioner to India.

In 1960, Dexter became the secretary of the Australian Universities Commission. This was a period of major expansion of the Australian universities system. He helped chairman of the commission, Sir Leslie Martin write a report into Australian universities, the recommendations of which were adopted. In 1967 Dexter became the Registrar (Property and Plans) at the Australian National University (ANU). In this role he oversaw a major construction program that included the construction of the Leonard Huxley, A. D. Hope and John Dedman buildings, Melville Hall, the Coombs Theatre, Graduate House, Toad Hall, and the cricket and football ovals.

Dexter retired on 1 May 1978. He published a second book, The ANU Campus, a history of the ANU site, in 1991. He died at his home in Turner, Australian Capital Territory, on 15 March 1992, and his remains were cremated. His papers are in the Australian War Memorial and the Australian National University Archives.

== Bibliography ==
- Dexter, David (1961). The New Guinea Offensives. Australia in the War of 1939–1945. Canberra: Australian War Memorial. OCLC 220806033.
- Dexter, David (1991). The ANU Campus. Canberra: Australian National University. ISBN 978-0-7315-1216-4. OCLC 27542214.
