= United Grand Lodge of New South Wales and the Australian Capital Territory =

Freemasonry lodge in Australia

Coordinates: 33°52′39″S 151°12′33″E

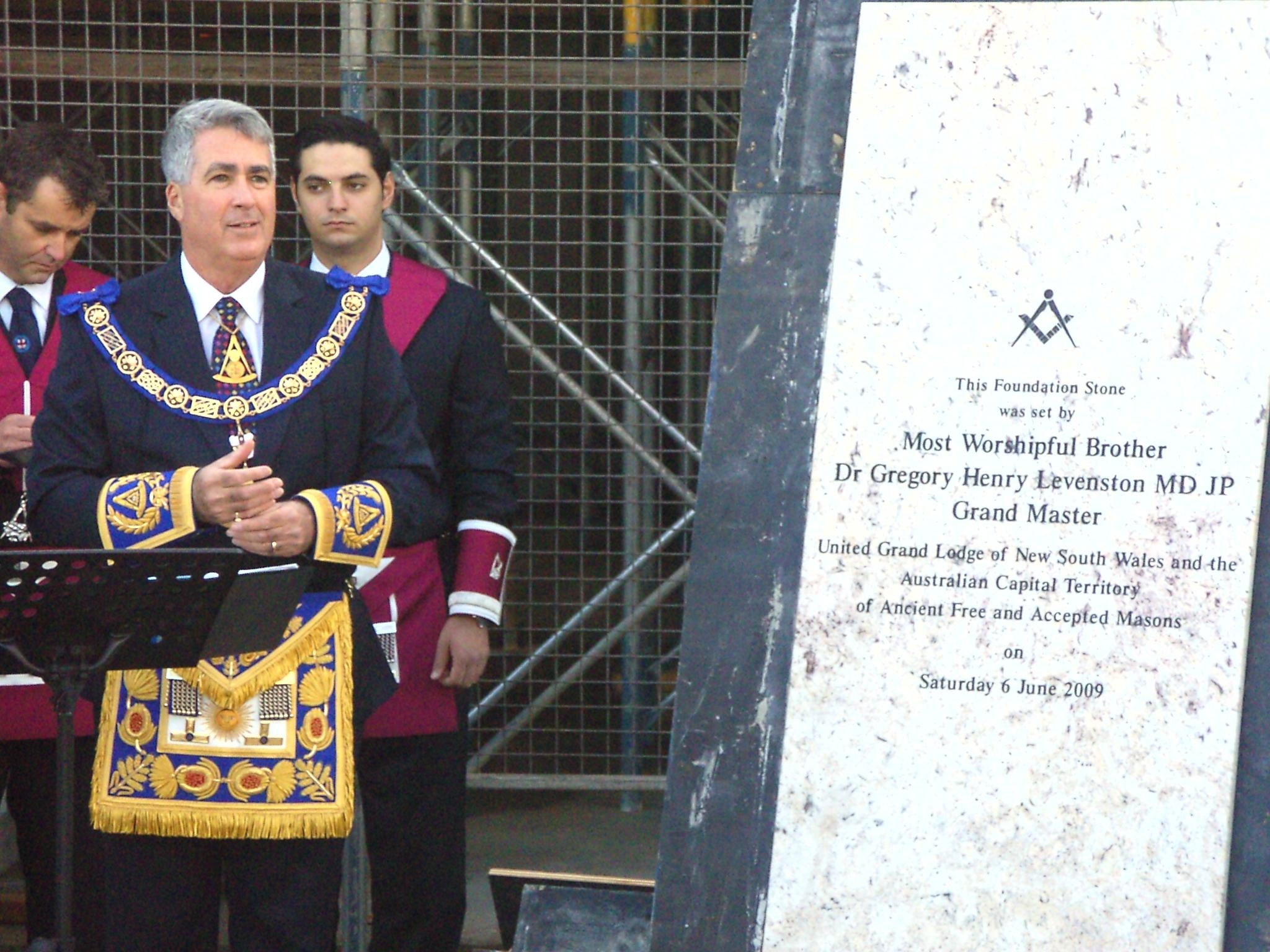
MWBro Dr Greg Levenston (Grand Master) laying the Foundation Stone of the Canberra Masonic Centre, 6 June 2009. Rear: Grand Stewards

The United Grand Lodge of New South Wales and the Australian Capital Territory is the main governing body of Freemasonry within the Australian state of New South Wales that also wholly encloses the Australian Capital Territory containing the national capital city, Canberra. It originated from the union in 1888 of the earlier 1849 provincial Grand Lodge under the United Grand Lodge of England and other district and provincial Grand Lodges of the Grand Lodge of Ireland and the Grand Lodge of Scotland.

The United Grand Lodge of NSW and ACT building is located in Sydney. The foundation stone for the current building on Castlereagh Street was laid on 15 May 1976. It was officially opened and dedicated on 10 March 1979. The office tower was built in 2005. The current building houses The Museum of Freemasonry, which is open to the public.

== Organisation ==
The Grand Lodge is led by an elected Grand Master, assisted by a Deputy Grand Master and an Assistant Grand Master, with a Grand Team.

The Grand Lodge is further organised into 4 Regions, each led by a Regional Grand Counsellor (RGC), which are in turn organised into various Districts, led by a District Grand Inspector of Workings (DGIW), comprising groups of lodges based on geography. Lodges meet in various buildings, ranging from individual lodge buildings to major city or urban centres, such as in Canberra.

The Grand Secretary heads the administration of the Grand Lodge from the headquarters at 279 Castlereagh Street, Sydney, on the north-west side of the corner with Goulburn Street.

== History ==
Freemasonry came to New South Wales with the regiments of the British Army soon after the First Fleet in 1788. It was banned by Governor King because of suspicions of republicanism.

The first stationary lodge, The Australian Social Lodge No.260 (Irish Constitution), was established by lodges working under Irish travelling warrants that were attached British regiments garrisoning the settlement in New South Wales. Lodge No.227 (attached to the 46th Regiment) and Lodge No.218 (attached to the 48th Regiment) admitted a number of civilians to membership and assisted in the dedication of The Australian Social Lodge in August 1820. In 1824, Lodge Leinster Marine of Australia, No.266 (Irish Constitution) was formed.

The first lodge under the English Constitution was warranted in June 1828 as the Lodge of Australia No.820. The first Scottish lodge was established in 1844 in Melbourne, then known as the Port Phillip Settlement and still part of New South Wales. It was not until 1851 that the first Scottish Lodge, Lodge of St. Andrew (No.358), was established in Sydney.

The first English Provincial Grand Lodge was opened in Sydney on 10 May 1849, Bro. John Williams being the first Provincial Grand Master. The institution grew and prospered; English lodges, The Maitland Lodge of Unity No.804 had been opened in 1847, followed by The Australian Lodge of Harmony No.814 (Sydney) in 1848 and the Armidale Lodge of Unity No.865 in 1851.

The Grand Lodge of Ireland and the Grand Lodge of Scotland were also warranting lodges in New South Wales, and creating their own provincial Grand Lodges. However, there was to become a growing level of dissatisfaction with the home Grand Lodges (England, Scotland and Ireland) due to the tyranny of distance and also the amount of money being sent away from the Colony. This dissatisfaction eventually led to the establishment of the Grand Lodge of New South Wales by three Irish Lodges and five Scottish Lodges on 3 December 1877. The new breakaway Grand Lodge was not favourably received by the home Grand Lodges and was not officially recognised until the union in 1888, although it did receive recognition from a majority of the world's Grand Lodges, especially from the various jurisdictions in the United States of America.

In the following 11 years, although there was much disharmony between the three organisations, the three constitutions continued to warrant lodges and membership grew. By the time of the formation of the United Grand Lodge in 1888, the Grand Lodge of New South Wales had fifty-one lodges on its register. Following Scottish tradition, The Australian Social Lodge, being the mother lodge of masons in New South Wales, was given the number 0 on the register.

On 16 August 1888, after considerable consultation, the Masters and Wardens of the one hundred and seventy-six lodges assembled, the articles of union were again adopted, and the " United Grand Lodge of New South Wales " declared to be duly constituted and established. The first Grand Master was Lord Carrington, Governor of New South Wales.

On 12 August 2015 the Grand Lodge installed the youngest Grand Master to preside over the jurisdiction (New South Wales and the Australian Capital Territory), James Robert Melville. J. Melville was 43 years old at the day of his installation and served as Grand Master for three years until August 2018.

== Grand Masters of UGL NSW & ACT ==
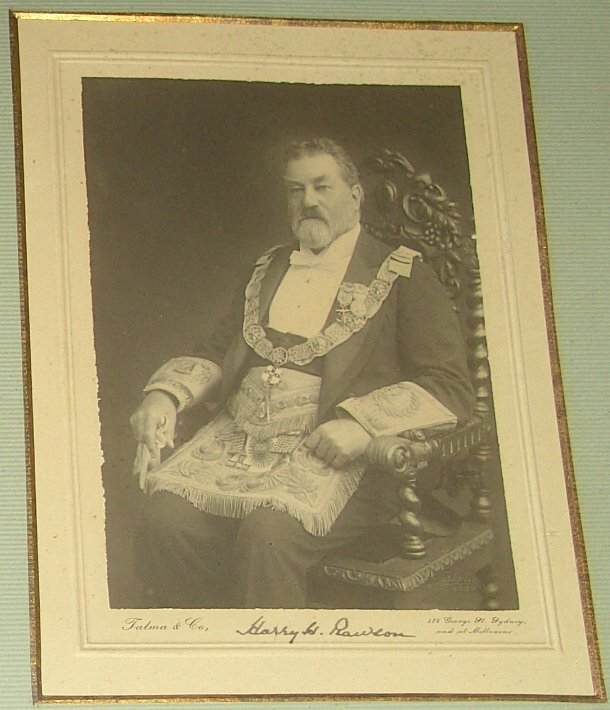
Admiral Sir Harry Rawson as Grand Master

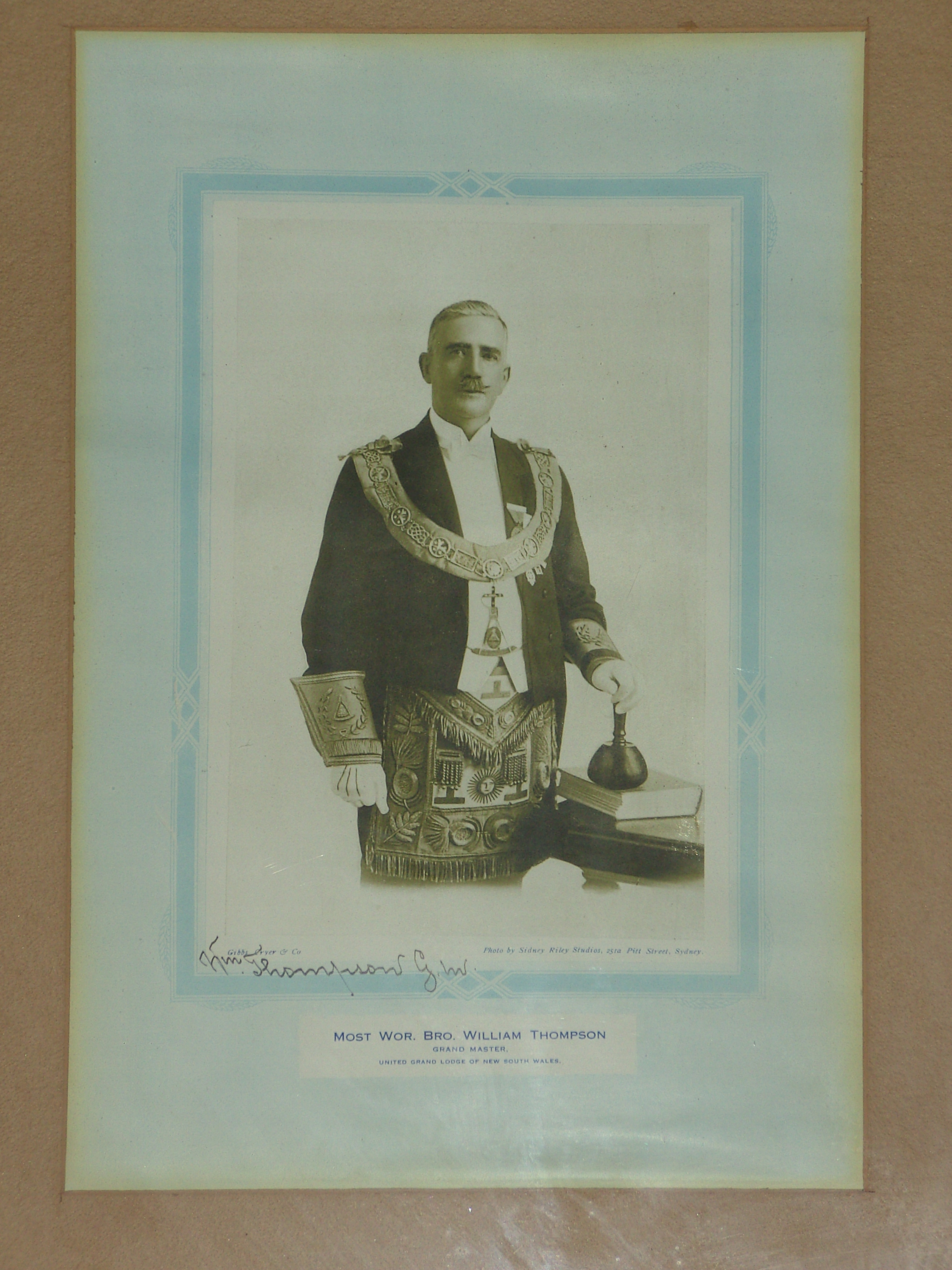
William Thompson, Grand Master from 1913

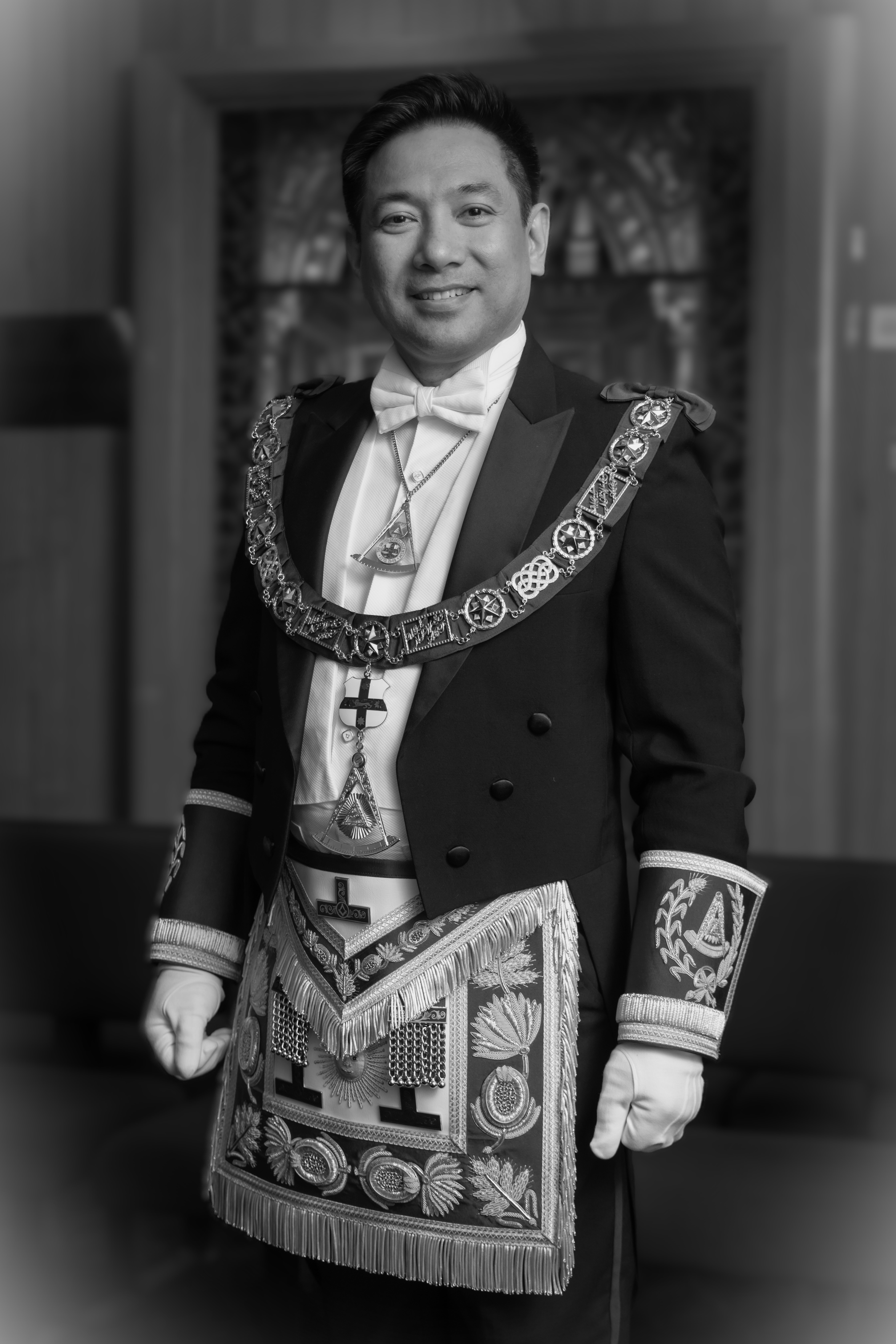
B Khris Albano - Grand Master from 2024

Grand Masters include:

- 1st, The Baron Carrington (1888–1891)
- 2nd, The Earl of Jersey (1891–1893)
- 3rd, Sir Robert Duff (1893–1895)
- 4th, Sir Joseph Palmer Abbott (1895–1899)
- 5th John Cochran Remington (1899-1905)
- 6th, Sir Harry Rawson (1905–1909)
- 7th, Hugh Montgomerie Hamilton (1909-1910)
- 8th, The Baron Chelmsford (1910–1913)
- 9th, Dr Charles U. Carruthers (1913-1914)
- 10th, William Thompson (1914-1924)
- 11th, John Goulston (1924-1928)
- 12th, The Baron Stonehaven (1928–1930)
- 13th, Aubrey Halloran (1930-1933)
- 14th & 16th, Frederick Maguire (1933-1935 & 1944-1945)
- 15th, The Baron Gowrie (1935–1944)
- 17th, Frank Whiddon (1945-1948)
- 18th, Sir Frank McDowell, Kt.(1948-1951)
- 19th, John Hargraves Hodgson (1951-1952)
- 20th, Sir John Northcott (1952–1955)
- 21st, Thomas Leslie Warren (1955-1959)
- 22nd, Harry Rickards Maas (1959-1962)
- 23rd, Edward Leslie Beers, C.B.E.(1962-1966)
- 24th, Eric Aubrey Primrose (1966-1969)
- 25th, Robert Arthur Hammond (1969-1972)
- 26th, Victor Charles Nathaniel Blight, C.B.E.(1972-1976)
- 27th, Noel William Warren (1976-1980)
- 28th, Harold Coates (1980–1985)
- 29th, Professor Roy A Woodman (1985-1988)
- 30th, Ronald Lewis Hale Johnson AM (1988-1992)
- 31st, Noel Frederick Dunn OAM (1992-1996)
- 32nd, Rev Raymond Green (1996-2000)
- 33rd, George Curry (2000-2002)
- 34th, Anthony Raymond Lauer (2002–2005)
- 35th, Raymond Barry Brooke (2005-2008)
- 36th, Dr Gregory Henry Levenston OAM (2009-2011)
- 37th & 39th, Derek James Robson AM (2011-2015 & 2018-2021)
- 38th, James Robert Melville (2015-2018)
- 40th, Lesley Norman Hicks (2021-2024)
- 41st, B Khris Albano (2024-present)

== Charities ==
The Grand Lodge's official charities are Grand Charity Fund, Benevolence Fund and The Grand Master's Disaster Relief Fund which are all managed under the umbrella of Masonicare: masoniCare

== Arms ==
Coat of arms of United Grand Lodge of New South Wales and the Australian Capital Territory
Notes This Coat of Arms was granted by the King of Arms, Royal College of Arms in London on the 125th anniversary of the UGL NSW & ACT, 16 August 2013. The Arms were designed by Mr William Hunt CStJ TD FCA, Windsor Herald, who is a Freemason. The symbolism behind each of the elements in the Arms is as follows: Crest A masonic square apex downwards Or in front of a Waratah flower Gules slipped and leaved Vert in front of a pair of compasses Or. Torse Argent and Sable. Escutcheon Checky Sable and Argent on a cross Gules four mullets of eight points Or over all on a chevron Argent a pair of compasses Sable. Supporters Dexter a kangaroo pendent from the dexter forefoot a junior warden's jewel sinister a lion guardant pendent from the sinister forefoot a senior warden's jewel all Or. Motto Juncta Juvant ("Together they help") Badge A sun in splendour Or charged with a masonic square apex downwards in front of a pair of compasses Sable.

== See also ==
- Australasian Grand Lodges

== Bibliography ==
- Cramp, Karl; Mackaness, George (1938). A History of the United Grand Lodge of NSW. Vol. 1. Angus & Robertson.
