= Major Downes =

British Army officer (1834–1923)

Major-General Major Downes CMG
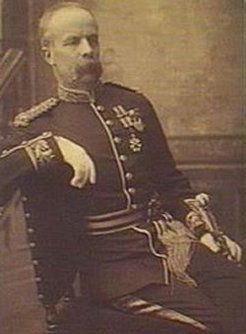
- Downes in 1890
- Born: 10 February 1834; Dedham, Essex, England
- Died: 15 October 1923 (aged 89); Brighton, Victoria, Australia
- Burial place: Brighton Cemetery
- Spouse: Ann Davey
- Children: Rupert Downes
- Military career
- Allegiance: United Kingdom
- Branch: British Army
- Service years: 1848–1885; 1888–1893; 1899–1902
- Rank: Major-General
- Commands: South Australian Military Forces
- Conflicts: Crimean War
- Awards: Companion of the Order of St Michael and St George

Major-General Major Francis Downes, CMG (10 February 1834 – 15 October 1923) was a British Army officer, who served as commandant of the colonial forces in South Australia.

Downes was the son of William Downes, of Dedham, Essex, England, and was educated at the Royal Military Academy, Woolwich; entered the Royal Artillery in 1852, was promoted lieutenant colonel in 1877, colonel in 1882, and major general in 1884, the year of his retirement. He served in the Crimean War in 1855 (medal with clasps and Turkish medal); was instructor in Fortifications at the Royal Military College, Sandhurst, in 1858–59; commanded the Royal Artillery on Mauritius in 1863–65, and on Saint Helena in 1869–71; was for five years Instructor to the Artillery School for Militia and Volunteer Officers; and subsequently held the position of Commandant of the South Australian Military Forces from 1877 to 1885, serving as a Member of the Royal Commission on Defences in 1881, and as Secretary of Defence for Victoria from 1885 to 1888. In March of the latter year, he was reappointed Commandant of the South Australian Military Forces. Major General Downes was appointed a Companion of the Order of St Michael and St George in 1885.

Downes died in Brighton, Melbourne, Australia, on 15 October 1923; he was buried with military honours in the Church of England portion of the Brighton Cemetery.

Downes married at Catton, Norwich, on 9 June 1858 to Helen Maria Chamberlain, daughter of Robert Chamberlain, of Colton House, Norwich. She died in Melbourne on 20 January 1903 aged 62. They had a daughter and four sons, including Rupert Downes, who became a major general and director-general of medical services of the Australian Military Forces.
