= Frederick Maguire =

Major-General Frederick Maguire CMG DSO VD FRCS FRACS FACS
- Born: 28 March 1888; Cobar, New South Wales
- Died: 10 June 1953 (aged 65); Darling Point, New South Wales
- Military career
- Allegiance: Australia
- Branch: Australian Army
- Service years: 1912–1942
- Rank: Major General
- Nickname: "Lassie"
- Unit: Australian Army Medical Corps
- Commands: Director General of Medical Services (1941–42); 9th Field Ambulance (1916–18)
- Conflicts: First World War; Asian and Pacific theatre; Western Front; Battle of Messines; Battle of Passchendaele; Second World War
- Awards: Companion of the Order of St Michael and St George; Distinguished Service Order; Officer of the Venerable Order of Saint John; Colonial Auxiliary Forces Officers' Decoration; Mentioned in Despatches (4)

Frederick Arthur Maguire (28 March 1888 – 10 June 1953) was an Australian physician, gynaecologist, and soldier, who spent much of his career with the Royal Prince Alfred Hospital, the University of Sydney and in the service of the Australian Army Medical Corps. Maguire served as Director General Australian Army Medical Services from 1941 to 1942 during the Second World War, and was later a founding member and chairman of the Australian Regional Council of the Royal College of Obstetricians and Gynaecologists.

Maguire was a noted Freemason and served as Grand Master of the United Grand Lodge of New South Wales and the Australian Capital Territory from 1933 to 1935 and 1944 to 1945.

Military offices
Preceded by Major General Rupert Downes	Director General of Medical Services; 1941–1942	Succeeded by Major General Roy Burston
