= 1953 Coronation Honours (Australia) =

1953 appointments in honour of the new monarch

The 1953 Coronation Honours were awarded in honour of the Coronation of Elizabeth II.

== Privy Council ==
- The Honourable Harold Edward Holt, Minister for Labour and National Service and Minister for Immigration. Commonwealth of Australia.
- The Honourable John McEwen, Minister for Commerce and Agriculture, Commonwealth of Australia.

== Knight Bachelor ==
- The Honourable Shirley Williams Jeffries, of the State of South Australia. For public services.
- The Honourable Geoffrey Sandford Reed, Judge of the Supreme Court, State of South Australia.
- Eric Ernest Von Bibra, Esq., OBE, AgentGeneral in London for the State of Tasmania.
- Corporal Raymond Douglas Huish, CBE, of Queensland, Australia, president of the Queensland Branch of the Returned Services League.

== Most Distinguished Order of St Michael and St George ==
=== Companion of the Order of St Michael and St George (CMG) ===
- Brigadier Thomas Charles Eastick, DSO, ED, President of the South Australian Branch of the Returned Sailors', Soldiers' and Airmen's League.

== Most Excellent Order of the British Empire ==
=== Knight Commander of the British Empire (KBE) ===
- Wilmot Hudson Fysh, Esq., DFC, Chairman and Managing Director of Qantas Empire Airways Limited.
- Major General Clive Selwyn Steele, DSO, MC, VD. For services to Engineering.

=== Commander of the Order of the British Empire (CBE) ===
- Maxwell Gordon Butcher, Esq., OBE, For public services in the State of Tasmania.
- Gilbert Brown, Esq., of the State of South Australia. For services in the development of Anaesthetics.
- Richard Henry Maclure Lea, Esq., General Manager of the Electricity Trust, State of South Australia.
- Charles Kingsley Murphy, Esq., Clerk of the House of Assembly, and Librarian to Parliament, State of Tasmania.

=== Officer of the Order of the British Empire (OBE) ===
- Ann Frances Ellen, Mrs. Adams, Matron, Lachlan Park Mental Hospital, State of Tasmania.
- John Bishop, Esq., Elder Professor of Music 'at the University of Adelaide, State of South Australia.
- William Charles Morris, Esq., formerly Headmaster of the Launceston High School, State of Tasmania
- Miss Mary Stuart Douglas, President of the Ex-Servicewomen's Association, and State Commissioner for Girl Guides, State of South Australia.
- Miss Gladys Ruth Gibson, Inspector, Education Department, and President of the National Council of Women, State of South Australia.
- Gavin Merrick Long, Esq., General Editor, Official History of Australia's part in World War II
- Rex Whaddon Parsons, Esq., Principal, School of Mines and Industries, State of South Australia.
- William Wilson, Esq., J.P., Council Clerk of the Lilydale Municipality, and formerly Secretary of the Municipal Association, State of Tasmania.

=== Member of the Order of the British Empire (MBE) ===
- George Patten Adams, Esq., of Westbury, State of Tasmania. For services to philanthropic and charitable movements.
- Frank Robert Dowse, Esq., Superintendent of Reserves, Launceston City Council, State of Tasmania.
- Miss Katherine Isabel Kewley, Matron of the Lady Victoria Buxton Girls' Club, State of South Australia.
- Mary Evangelist, Mrs. Lamp, of Launceston, State of Tasmania. For social welfare services.
- Miss Mary Julia Lawes. For services to the Red Cross in the State of South Australia.
- Ida Josephine Isabell, Mrs. Norton. For social welfare services, especially to the Royal Hobart Hospital, State of Tasmania.
- Albert Baden Thompson, Esq., a prominent Trade Unionist, and a member of the Board of Management of the State Bank, in the State of South Australia.
- Benjamin Watkins, Esq. For public and philanthropic services in the State of Tasmania.
- Cecil Hobart Webster, Esq. For services to patriotic and philanthropic organisations in the State of Tasmania.

== Imperial Service Order ==
=== Companion of the Imperial Service Order (ISO) ===
- Harold Bruce Bennett, Esq., MBE, ED, Director of Industrial Development, State of Tasmania.
- William Richard Penhall, Esq., Secretary, Aborigines Protection Board, State of South Australia.

== British Empire Medal (BEM) ==
- Walter Muggleton, Messenger, Department of the Premier, State of South Australia.

== Royal Red Cross ==
=== Member of the Royal Red Cross (RRC) ===
- Wing Commander George Hubert Newbourne Shiells, DFC, (033077), Royal Australian Air Force.
