= Australia in the War of 1939–1945 =

Official history series covering Australian involvement in the Second World War

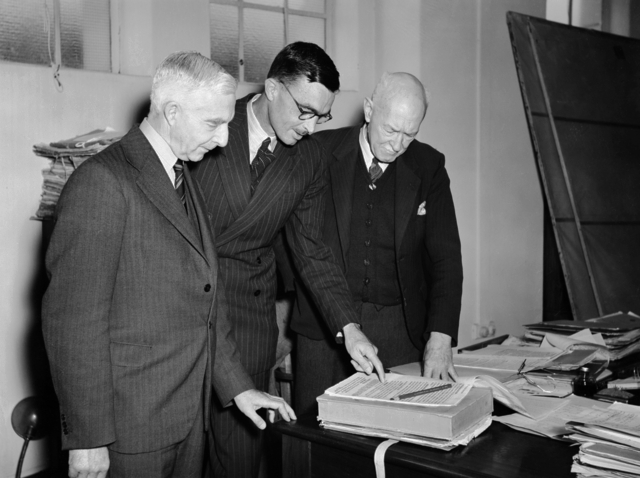
- A. G. Butler (right), Gavin Long (centre) and Allan S. Walker (left) discuss a manuscript in the Australian War Memorial library in 1945
- Author: Gavin Long (general editor) Authors: S. J. Butlin; David Dexter; G. Hermon Gill; Douglas Gillison; Paul Hasluck; John Herington; Barton Maughan; Dudley McCarthy; D. P . Mellor; George Odgers; Boris Schedvin; Allan S. Walker; Lionel Wigmore
- Language: English
- Subject: Military history of Australia in World War II
- Genre: Military history
- Publisher: Australian War Memorial
- Publication date: 1952–1977
- Publication place: Australia
- Media type: Print; Online
- ISBN: 978-0-642-99366-3
- OCLC: 906326891
- Preceded by: Official History of Australia in the War of 1914–1918
- Followed by: Australia in the Korean War 1950–53

Australia in the War of 1939–1945 is a 22-volume official history series covering Australian involvement in the Second World War. The series was published by the Australian War Memorial between 1952 and 1977, most of the volumes being edited by Gavin Long, who also wrote three volumes and the summary volume The Six Year War.

In contrast to the Official History of Australia in the War of 1914–1918, the series has a greater focus on the war's impact upon domestic events, including volumes on operations of the Australian Government and contributions made by Australian industry and science. Australia in the War of 1939–1945 includes a series on the history of the Australian military medical services and the problems encountered by these services during the war.

== Preparations ==
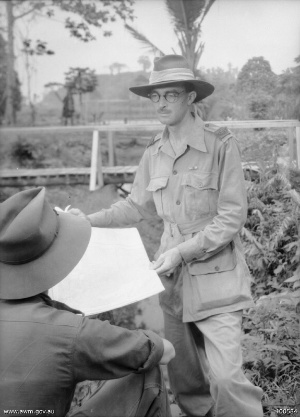
Gavin Long in Lae, New Guinea in July 1944 while attached to the headquarters of New Guinea Force

C.E.W. Bean, the editor and principal author of the Official History of Australia in the War of 1914–1918, proposed to the Australian government in late 1941 that preparations begin on an official history of the world war then in progress. The government did not accept this proposal, believing that it was premature. Bean renewed his proposal in November 1942, and it was accepted by the government.

In April 1943 the Australian War Cabinet decided that an official history of Australia's involvement in World War II should be written. Gavin Long was appointed the official historian and general editor of the prospective series on the recommendation of Bean in March 1943. Long presented a provisional plan of the series to the War Cabinet which approved it in July 1943. It was envisaged that the series would consist of 14 volumes, each of about 500 pages. Long's provisional plan stated that the series' purpose was

a. to crystallise the facts once and for all for any subsequent use
b. to establish a story that will carry conviction in other countries
c. to satisfy the men who took part that the history is an adequate memorial of their efforts and sacrifices.

— Gavin Long, 1944

The War Cabinet approved a revised plan shortly after the end of the war and after further refinements in 1950, it was decided that the series would comprise 22 volumes. These works mainly covered the operations of the Australian armed forces and the only technical volumes covered medical services; sub-series on domestic politics and the war economy were included. Some senior officers advocated volumes covering military logistics and administration but without success. Long proposed a volume on Australian strategic policy, including negotiations with the British and United States governments but this was rejected by the Australian government on the grounds that it could be detrimental to postwar policy. In 1982 the Australian War Memorial jointly published David Horner's book High Command. Australia and Allied Strategy 1939–1945 which was marketed as being "the book which Prime Minister John Curtin directed the official historian not to write". Long also considered volumes on the women's services and general defence policy, but neither eventuated.

== Writing the series ==
Gavin Long selected the authors of the series, and these appointments were approved by a government committee. Long required that the authors have "some or all of three positive qualifications: experience of the events, proved ability to write lucidly and engagingly, [and] training as a historian". It was also decided that authors would not be able to write on topics in which they had played a leading part during the war. Selecting and engaging authors took up much of Long's time, and some potential authors declined offers of appointment. A replacement author for Chester Wilmot's volume on the Siege of Tobruk and Battle of El Alamein also had to be found in 1954 after he was killed in a plane crash. Once selected by Long, authors were confirmed by a committee comprising the Prime Minister, two or three other ministers and the Leader of the Opposition. Long and the general editor of the medical series were salaried and the other authors signed contracts to complete their work within a specified time frame and were paid in instalments as parts of their work were delivered. Of the 13 principal authors, five were academics and five were journalists. The official historians were supported by salaried research assistants who were members of the Australian Public Service and the project was administered by the Department of the Interior. Long retired in 1963, and his assistant Bill Sweeting assumed the role of editor.

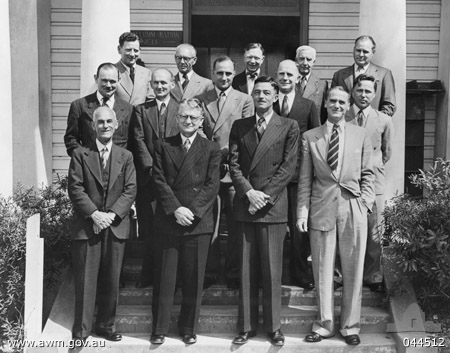
A group photo of the authors of Australia in the War of 1939–1945 in 1954. Chester Wilmot died later in the year and was replaced by Barton Maughan.

Although the series was funded by the Australian Government, the authors were free to write on all topics other than technical secrets that were classified at the time, and were not otherwise censored. In line with a request by the US and British governments, the official historians in Australia, Britain, Canada, New Zealand and the US were not given access to Ultra intelligence gained from decrypting German codes. The vetting process for the volumes in the series also sought to ensure that they did not disclose that German codes had been broken, as this was still classified at the time. Long may have not even been informed that German or Japanese codes had been broken. The authors were given unrestricted access to all other official records, and the Army, Navy and Air series were mainly based on these records and the hundreds of interviews Long had conducted with Australian military personnel during the war. German, Italian and Japanese records were also used to provide information on the enemies the Australian military fought. Draft chapters were sent for comment to the official historians in Britain, New Zealand and the United States.

The series was written to be read by a general audience. It aimed to provide the general populace with a comprehensive account of Australia's role in the war, including coverage of the 'home front' and industrial and medical aspects of the war. The series also had a nationalistic motivation, which was in line with Long's goal of it ensuring that Australia's role was not overshadowed by that of Britain and the United States. Long believed that this motivation was shared by the official historians for the other Dominion countries.

The 22 volumes were published by the Australian War Memorial between 1952 and 1977, most books being completed and released in the 1950s and early 1960s. The publishing company Collins began a project to print the series with new introductions by modern scholars in the 1980s after the University of Queensland Press reprinted the Official History of Australia in the War of 1914–1918. The project was terminated after the first three volumes in the Army series and both volumes in the Navy series were reprinted.

== Volumes ==
The 22 volumes in Australia in the War of 1939–1945 were organised into five series. Gavin Long edited the Army, Navy, Air and Civil series and Allan S. Walker edited the Medical series and wrote most of the volumes on this topic. The series also included a concise history of Australia's role in the war, which was written by Long and titled The Six Years War.

=== Series 1 – Army ===
- Volume I – To Benghazi – Gavin Long (1952)
- Volume II – Greece, Crete and Syria – Gavin Long (1953)
- Volume III – Tobruk and El Alamein – Barton Maughan (1967)
- Volume IV – The Japanese Thrust – Lionel Wigmore (1957)
- Volume V – South–West Pacific Area – First Year: Kokoda to Wau – Dudley McCarthy (1959)
- Volume VI – The New Guinea Offensives – David Dexter (1961)
- Volume VII – The Final Campaigns – Gavin Long (1963)

Long was the author of the first volume in the series to be published, To Benghazi. It received positive reviews from critics. He also wrote Greece, Crete and Syria and The Final Campaigns.

=== Series 2 – Navy ===
- Volume I – Royal Australian Navy, 1939–1942 – G. Hermon Gill (1957)
- Volume II – Royal Australian Navy, 1942–1945 – G. Hermon Gill (1968)

G. Hermon Gill wrote both the volumes in the series on the Royal Australian Navy's activities. Gill was a journalist who had served in the RAN's Naval Intelligence Division and Naval Historical Records section during the war. He was more successful than most of the other authors in placing his subject in the global context in which it operated, though on occasions he exaggerated the RAN's importance in Australia's war effort. The two volumes in the naval series were published in 1957 and 1969.

Gill's account of the battle between HMAS Sydney and the German auxiliary cruiser Kormoran in November 1941 has been criticised by some authors who view it as being part of an official cover-up, but Gill reached his conclusions independently and without censorship and his account of the battle is generally considered to have been as accurate as possible given that little evidence was available on the events that led to Sydney being sunk with the loss of her entire crew. Naval historian and Anglican Bishop to the Australian Defence Force Tom Frame has argued that although Gill "was a man of integrity" and not influenced by the Navy, his account of the battle is "bad history" as it is contradictory and "went beyond the reliable and corroborated evidence which was available to him".

=== Series 3 – Air ===
- Volume I – Royal Australian Air Force, 1939–1942 – Douglas Gillison (1962)
- Volume II – Air War Against Japan, 1943–1945 – George Odgers (1957)
- Volume III – Air War Against Germany and Italy, 1939–1943 – John Herington (1954)
- Volume IV – Air Power Over Europe, 1944–1945 – John Herington (1963)

The Air series covers the operations of the Royal Australian Air Force during the war, including the experiences of thousands of members of the RAAF who were trained through the Empire Air Training Scheme (EATS) and served with the Royal Air Force. The series was written by Douglas Gillison who was regarded as Australia's leading aviation journalist and served in the RAAF during the war, George Odgers, a journalist who had served in the Army and Air Force and John Herington, a trained historian who had served in RAF and RAAF maritime patrol squadrons. Odgers' volume covered only RAAF operations against Japan, Gillison and Herington covered the diverse experiences of the EATS graduates who served in over 500 British squadrons. Herington wrote a comprehensive short history of British air warfare, with a focus on the few Australian squadrons and the main activities of Australian personnel in RAF units. Gillison and Herington also wrote about how EATS operated and its implications for Australia. Herington's account of EATS is generally considered superior to that provided by Gillison, whose account is regarded as relatively uncritical of the scheme.

=== Series 4 – Civil ===
- Volume I – The Government and the People, 1939–1941 – Paul Hasluck (1952)
- Volume II – The Government and the People, 1942–1945 – Paul Hasluck (1970)
- Volume III – War Economy, 1939–1942 – S.J. Butlin (1955)
- Volume IV – War Economy, 1942–1945 – S.J. Butlin and C. B. Schedvin (1977)
- Volume V – The Role of Science and Industry – David P. Mellor (1958)

Long considered the inclusion of Ernest Scott's volume on Australia During the War to be an "unorthodox characteristic" of Bean's series, but by the time Long started planning the Second World War series there was no doubt that volumes on the "Home front" would be included. Like Scott's volume, these took the longest to write. The first, Paul Hasluck's The Government and the People, 1939–1941 appeared in 1952, but Hasluck was elected as the member for Curtin at the 1949 election, and served as a cabinet minister until 1969. His ministerial duties delayed the second volume, which was not published until after Hasluck became Governor-General. Hasluck's ability to provide an unbiased account when he was a Liberal politician did not escape critical comment, but historians tend to judge his work as "fair and accurate". In the end, Hasluck's biases tended to be personal rather than partisan. He admired John Curtin as a fellow Western Australian and Robert Menzies as a fellow Liberal, and clung to his belief in parliamentary democracy despite its near demise during the war.

The economic volumes by Sydney Butlin suffered a similar fate; after the first volume appeared in 1955, Butlin became increasing involved in administration at the University of Sydney. The second volume, co-authored with Boris Schedvin, finally appeared shortly before Butlin's death in 1977. The other volume of the series, David Mellor's The Role of Science and Industry, was the most unusual volume of all, and still stands unique in Australian official war histories in its subject, although Mellor was criticised for hewing too closely to the views of his sources, particularly Major General John O'Brien, the Deputy Master General of the Ordnance.

=== Series 5 – Medical ===
- Volume I – Clinical Problems of War – Allan S. Walker (1952)
- Volume II – Middle East and Far East – Allan S. Walker (1953)
- Volume III – The Island Campaigns – Allan S. Walker (1957)
- Volume IV – Medical Services of the Royal Australian Navy and Royal Australian Air Force with a section on women in the Army Medical Services – Allan S. Walker and others (1961)

Allan S. Walker was a pathology specialist who served with Australian Army medical units in both world wars and taught at the University of Sydney. He declined Long's initial invitation to write the Medical series in 1944, but accepted it after Long's second choice, Rupert Downes, was killed in 1945. Downes had intended to engage specialist authors, but Walker regarded this a being impractical and wrote the series himself. Walker wrote the first three volumes and completed much of the work for the final volume before ill-health forced him to resign in 1956 and the book was completed by other writers. The five chapters on the experiences of women in the Army Medical Services in Volume IV are significant as they cover the first time large numbers of female members of the Australian military had been posted overseas. The medical volumes were written primarily for the benefit of practitioners of military medicine, but have a wider appeal as they contain military detail not found in other volumes. The books proved relatively popular, and were reprinted in the years after publication.

=== The Six Years War ===
The Six Years War was Gavin Long's short history of Australia's role in World War II. In 1943 Long proposed producing a short history of Australia's role in the war as soon as possible after the war ended. This did not eventuate, and The Six Years War was the second-last volume to be published. Long began work on the book in 1945 and continued on it throughout the official history project. The Six Years War is "derived almost entirely" from the work of the 13 authors of the official history series, and these authors drafted substantial parts of the book. Long completed the book's manuscript in 1967, but its publication was delayed until 1973 while the second volumes in the Navy and Civil series were completed. Long did not live to see the book published as he died in October 1968.

== Reception ==
Australia in the War of 1939–1945 had less of an impact on later Australian histories of World War II than the Official History of Australia in the War of 1914–1918 has had on histories of World War I. The series has been criticised as lacking the authority of Bean's work and some of the volumes on campaigns are regarded as over-detailed. The volumes dealing with government and politics and the war economy remain dominant in their fields, however. Bean's history has also out-sold the World War II series. Although Gavin Long's achievement has not received the same degree of recognition as C.E.W. Bean's, both series are generally seen as having created an important tradition for Australian official histories which includes high standards of accuracy, comprehensiveness and literary skill.

The lack of footnotes to the official documents and other primary sources consulted by the official historians were identified as a shortcoming of the series by some reviewers. For instance, in a generally positive review of Royal Australian Air Force, 1939–1942 James C. Olson stated that "Although the author had access to official documents and obviously made extensive use of them, he seldom cites documentary sources- a serious shortcoming, particularly in the absence of a bibliography". Similarly, USAAF official historian Robert F. Futrell noted in his review of Air War Against Japan 1943–1945 that "While the author acknowledges the official collection of the RAAF War History Section as his principal source, the volume contains no bibliography, or essay on sources, and footnote citations are unusually sparse. This lack of exact documentation reduces the value of the history to serious military scholars, who may well wish to evaluate the author's facts in terms of their source". The next official military history series commissioned by the Australian Government, Australia in the Korean War 1950–53 (published between 1981 and 1985), included footnotes to primary sources.

The level of detail in the series was also considered excessive by some reviewers. British official historian Stephen Roskill regarded Royal Australian Navy, 1942–1945 as being "well written, excellently illustrated and produced, and provided with a good index", but stated that it was "perhaps too detailed for the general reader". In his unfavourable review of The Final Campaigns Louis Morton, who wrote a volume in the official history of the US Army in World War II, judged that "even the student of military affairs and of World War II will find this meticulous account of operations that had little bearing on the final outcome far too detailed". In 1992, Australian historian Peter Stanley suggested the New Guinea Offensives' length and highly detailed narrative may have contributed to the fighting in New Guinea during 1943 and 1944 being little known amongst the general public and neglected by other historians.

Though much has been written on C.E.W. Bean and the other authors of the Official History of Australia in the War of 1914–1918, there has to date been little research published on how Australia in the War of 1939–1945 was written and the experiences of Long and the other authors.
