= Official History of Australia in the War of 1914–1918 =

Australian 12-volume history series

- Author: C. E. W. Bean (editor)
- Language: English
- Subject: Military history of Australia during World War I
- Genre: Military history
- Publisher: Australian War Memorial
- Publication date: 1921–1943
- Publication place: Australia
- Followed by: Australia in the War of 1939–1945

The Official History of Australia in the War of 1914–1918 is a 12-volume series covering Australian involvement in the First World War. The series was edited by C. E. W. Bean, who also wrote six of the volumes, and was published between 1920 and 1942. The first seven volumes deal with the Australian Imperial Force while other volumes deal with the Australian Naval and Military Expeditionary Force at Rabaul, the Royal Australian Navy, the Australian Flying Corps and the home front; the final volume is a photographic record.

Unlike other official histories which have been aimed at military staff, Bean intended the Australian history to be accessible to a non-military audience. The relatively small size of the Australian forces, enabled the history to be presented in great detail, giving accounts of individual actions that would not have been possible when covering a larger force. Bean devoted over 100 pages to the Battle of Fromelles, a relatively small action intended as a diversion during the Battle of the Somme, which lasted one night and involved the 5th Australian Division. Fromelles was also the first time that the First Australian Imperial Force (AIF) saw action on the Western Front and was very costly for the Australians, with 5,533 men killed, wounded or captured.

== Volumes ==
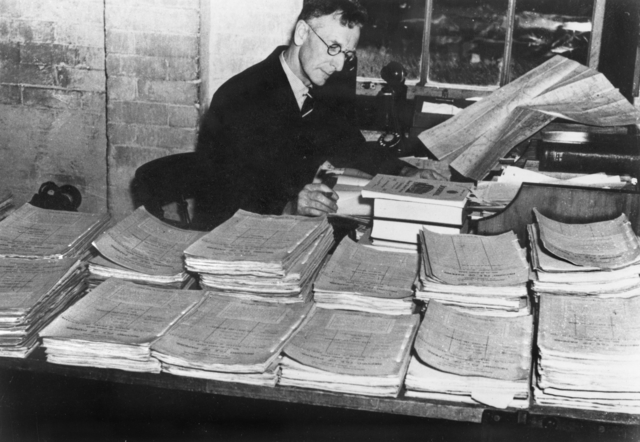
C.E.W. Bean studying Army documents while working on the official history in 1935

- Volume I – The Story of Anzac: the first phase, C.E.W Bean, 1921
- Volume II – The Story of Anzac: from 4 May, 1915 to the evacuation, C.E.W Bean, 1924
- Volume III – The Australian Imperial Force in France: 1916, C.E.W Bean, 1929
- Volume IV – The Australian Imperial Force in France: 1917, C.E.W Bean, 1933
- Volume V – The Australian Imperial Force in France: December 1917 – May 1918, C.E.W Bean, 1937
- Volume VI – The Australian Imperial Force in France: May 1918 – the Armistice, C.E.W Bean, 1942
- Volume VII – The Australian Imperial Force in Sinai and Palestine: 1914 – 1918, H.S. Gullett, 1923
- Volume VIII – The Australian Flying Corps: 1914 – 1918, Frederic Morley Cutlack, 1923
- Volume IX – The Royal Australian Navy: 1914 – 1918, Arthur W. Jose, 1928
- Volume X – The Australians at Rabaul, Seaforth Simpson Mackenzie, 1927
- Volume XI – Australia During the War, Ernest Scott, 1936
- Volume XII – Photographic Record of the War

== Other volumes ==
The three volumes of the Official History of the Australian Army Medical Services, 1914–1918, mostly written by Arthur Butler, are also considered by the Australian War Memorial to be Volumes XIII, XIV & XV of the Official History.

- Volume I – Gallipoli, Palestine and New Guinea (2nd edition, 1938) first published 1930
- Volume II – The Western Front (1st edition, 1940)
- Volume III – Special Problems and Services (1st edition, 1943)

Following the publication of the final volume, Bean compiled Anzac to Amiens, a condensed history in one volume aimed at the general public, which was published in 1946. This was followed in 1948 by Gallipoli Mission which detailed how he and his team had researched what had happened in Gallipoli.

== See also ==
- Military Operations – 29-volume British official history of the war on land, edited by Brigadier-General Sir James Edmonds, part of the 109 volumes of the History of the Great War based on Official Documents by Direction of the Committee of Imperial Defence (1922–1949).
