= Gavin Long =

Australian journalist and historian

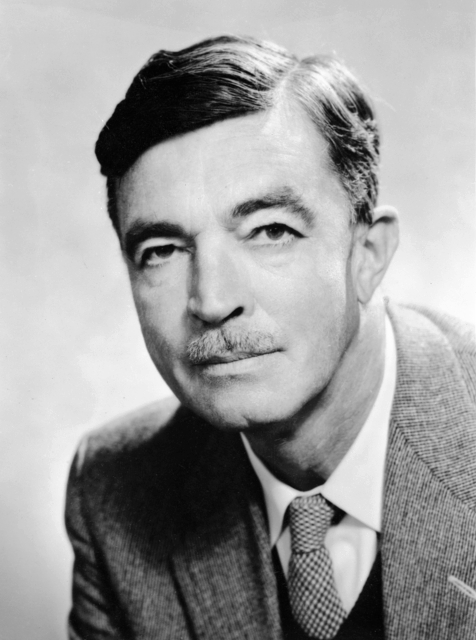
- Born: Gavin Merrick Long; 31 May 1901; Foster, Victoria
- Died: 10 October 1968 (aged 67); Deakin, Australian Capital Territory
- Awards: Officer of the Order of the British Empire (1953); Gold Cross of the Order of the Phoenix (1956)

Academic background
- Education: University of Sydney
- Influences: Charles Bean

Academic work
- Institutions: Australian War Memorial
- Main interests: Australian military history of the Second World War
- Notable works: Australia in the War of 1939–1945

Gavin Merrick Long OBE (31 May 1901 – 10 October 1968) was an Australian journalist and military historian. He was the general editor of the official history series Australia in the War of 1939–1945 and the author of three of its twenty-two volumes.

== Early life ==
Gavin Long was born in Foster, Victoria, on 31 May 1901, the eldest of six children of George Merrick Long, a clergyman, and his wife, Felecie Alexandra née Joyce. He was educated at Trinity Grammar School in Kew, Victoria, where his father was the first headmaster, and All Saints' College, Bathurst, the family having moved there when his father became the local bishop.

Long completed a Bachelor of Arts degree at the University of Sydney in 1922 and taught at The King's School, Parramatta in 1922 and 1923. After working as a jackeroo in 1924, he earned a Diploma of Education from the University of Sydney in 1925. In 1925, he travelled to England, where he secretly married Mary Jocelyn Britten, the daughter of a former headmaster of All Saints' College, at the register office in Kensington on 5 September. During his time in England he worked at Australia House. Jocelyn returned to Australia two weeks after their marriage; Long followed in March 1926. They were married again at St Peter's Church, Eastern Hill, in Melbourne, on 24 September 1926. They had two children: a daughter, Jenifer, and a son, Jeremy.

== Journalist ==
After his return to Australia, Long worked as a journalist and moved between several newspapers. He worked for the Daily Guardian in Sydney, and then, from 1926 to 1930, at The Argus in Melbourne. He was made a senior reporter in 1930 but was later reduced in rank due to the impact of the Great Depression on the paper. He was appointed a sub-editor at The Sydney Morning Herald in July 1931, becoming chief cable sub-editor. He held this job until he was posted to the Herald's London office in 1938.

During this time, he become a leading writer on defence matters. Under the editorship of Hugh McClure Smith, the Herald condemned the British government's policy of appeasement of Germany and Japan, a position Long endorsed. Long accompanied the Governor-General of Australia, Lord Gowrie on a visit to Java and Singapore in March and April 1938, as a result of which he produced a series of articles that sounded warnings against reliance on the Singapore strategy. Long wrote 60,000 words on defence matters, calling for the development of the munitions industry, the procurement of additional equipment and increases in the size and capability of the Australian defence forces.

On 9 January 1939, Long, with his wife Jocelyn and children, arrived in the United Kingdom on a two-year assignment to The Sydney Morning Herald's cable office on Fleet Street. The family visited Germany in April. On 10 October, shortly after the outbreak of the Second World War, Long became the Herald's war correspondent with the British Expeditionary Force in France. As such, he covered the Phoney War and the Battle of France, until he was evacuated from Boulogne on 21 May 1940. Jocelyn and children embarked for Australia on the SS Orcades on 2 July.

In October 1940, Long was sent to Egypt where he reported on the 6th Australian Division in its campaigns in Libya and the Greece, where he participated in another evacuation on 24 April 1941. He was then recalled to Australia, arriving at Sydney Airport on 10 June, and continued writing on defence matters as the Herald's defence correspondent.

== Military historian ==
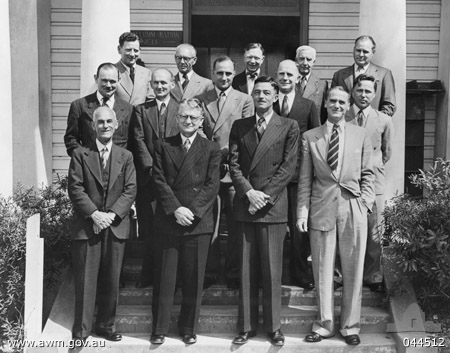
Long (front row, second from right) with the other authors of the official history series at a meeting in 1954

On 16 February 1943, on the recommendation of Charles Bean, the editor of the Official History of Australia in the War of 1914–1918, Long was appointed general editor of the Australia in the War of 1939–1945. Based at the Australian War Memorial in Canberra, he spent the remainder of the war planning the series and visiting forward areas to interview members of the Australian military, during which he sought out information not just about events as they unfolded, but also about events earlier in the war to fill in gaps in the narrative.

After the war Long played a key role in the official history project, which ultimately became a 22-volume official history of Australia's involvement. Long chose the authors of his volumes: five, including himself, were journalists and five were academics; half had served in uniform during the war and two had been closely involved in the events they were writing about. At Long's insistence, all were "of the generation that belongs to this war rather than to the last". As well as providing guidance to the other authors, he wrote three of the volumes in the series: To Benghazi (1952), Greece, Crete and Syria (1953) and The Final Campaigns (1963).

Long retired as general editor in 1963. This was because he believed that a full-time editor was no longer required as the series was nearing completion. His books were well received by reviewers, and his close involvement with the other authors gave the series a unity of purpose and method. He produced a style guide for the project that was regularly updated between 1945 and 1953. By the time of his death, all but one of the volumes of the official history had appeared; that final volume, War Economy 1942–1945, appeared in 1977.

== Later life ==
Long continued to write after his retirement from the official history project. He was a research fellow with the Australian Dictionary of Biography, was part of the team which produced the Australian Government's Style Guide and contributed over ninety articles and book reviews to The Canberra Times. He also wrote two further military history books, MacArthur as Military Commander (1969) and The Six Years War (1973), a concise, one-volume summary of Australia's involvement in the Second World War.

Long was appointed an Officer of the Order of the British Empire (OBE) in the 1953 Coronation Honours for his services as editor of the official history. In 1956, he was awarded the Greek Gold Cross of the Royal Order of the Phoenix for "promoting Greece’s stature abroad". All Saint's College named two of its houses after Bean and Long.

Long died of lung cancer on 10 October 1968 at his home in Deakin, Australian Capital Territory, and was cremated. His papers are held by the Australian War Memorial.

== Bibliography ==
- To Benghazi (1952)
- Greece, Crete and Syria (1953)
- The Final Campaigns (1963)
- MacArthur as Military Commander (1969)
- The Six Years War (1973)
