= George James Coates =

Australian painter and war artist

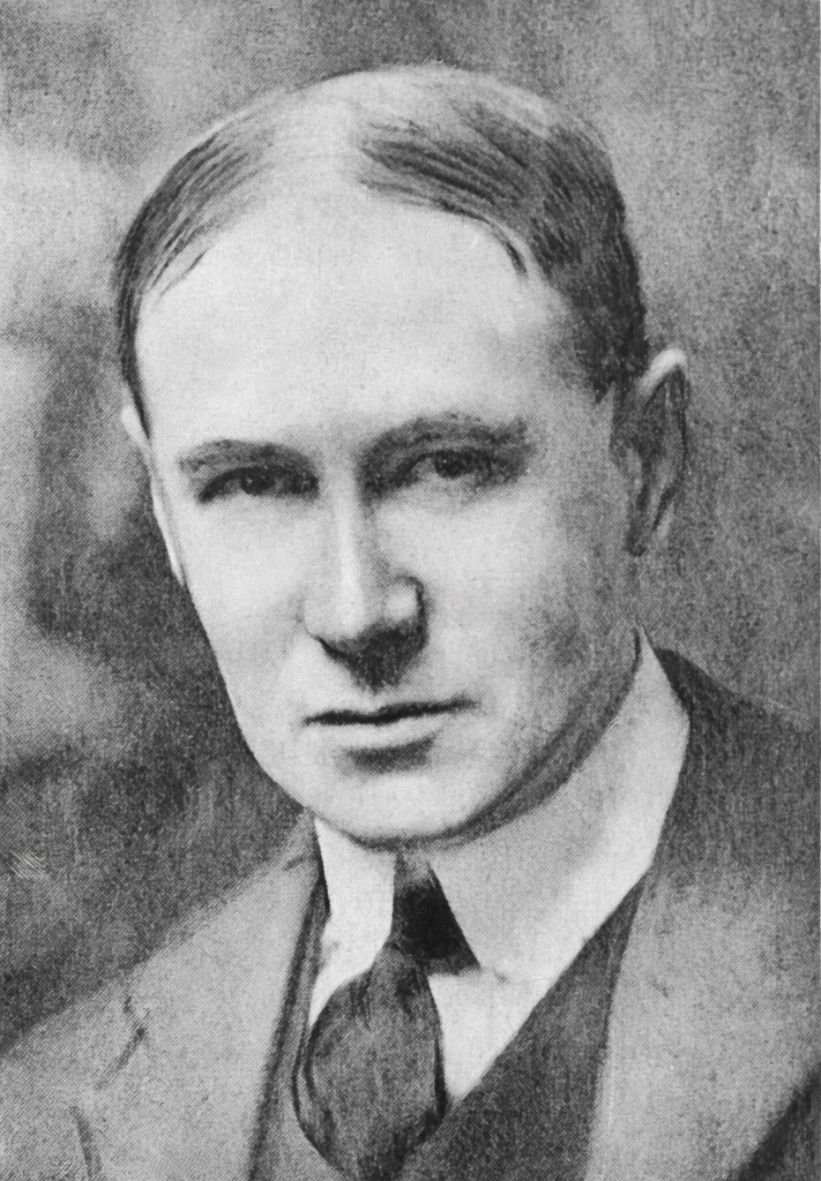
- George Coates in 1921
- Born: 8 August 1869; South Melbourne, Victoria, Australia
- Died: 27 July 1930 (aged 60); London, England
- Education: Académie Julian; National Gallery of Victoria Art School
- Known for: portrait painter
- Spouse: Dora Meeson
- Website: George Coates DAAO

George James Coates ROI (8 August 1869 – 27 July 1930) was an Australian painter, primarily a portraitist.

== Education and training ==
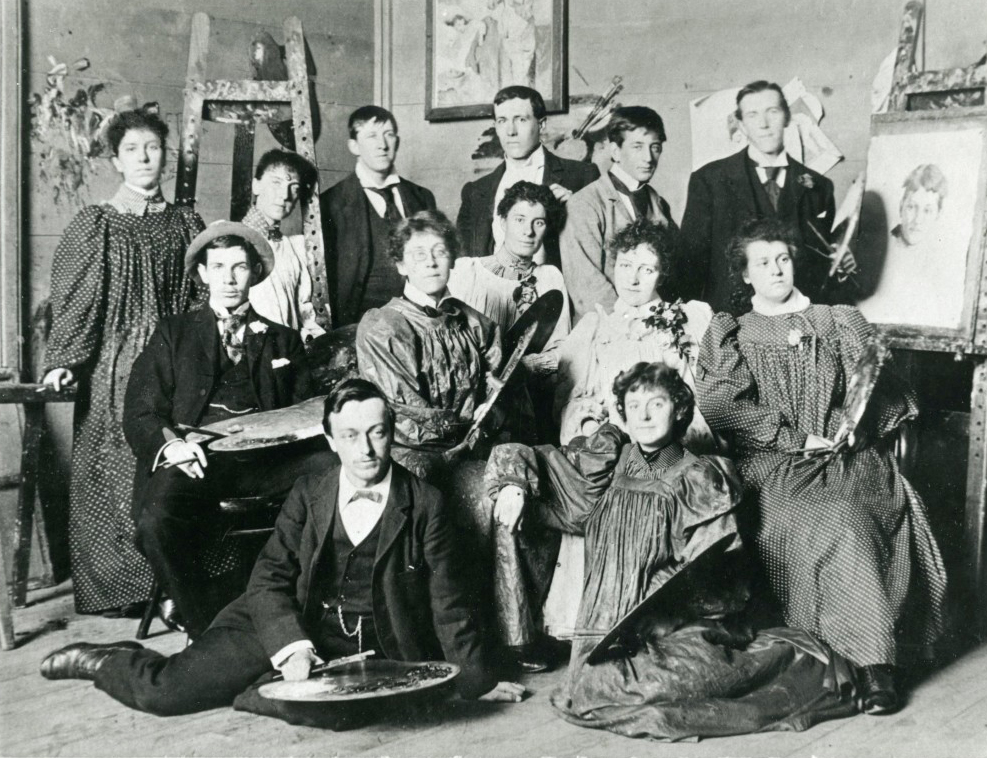
National Gallery of Victoria Art School students 1896. Back: Amy Mann, Agnes Kirkwood, Leon Pole, George Coates, Albert Ends, Hugh Ramsay Middle: James S. MacDonald, Dora Meeson, Jo Sweatman, Ada Coutie, Isabel Hunter Front: George Pontin, Portia Geach

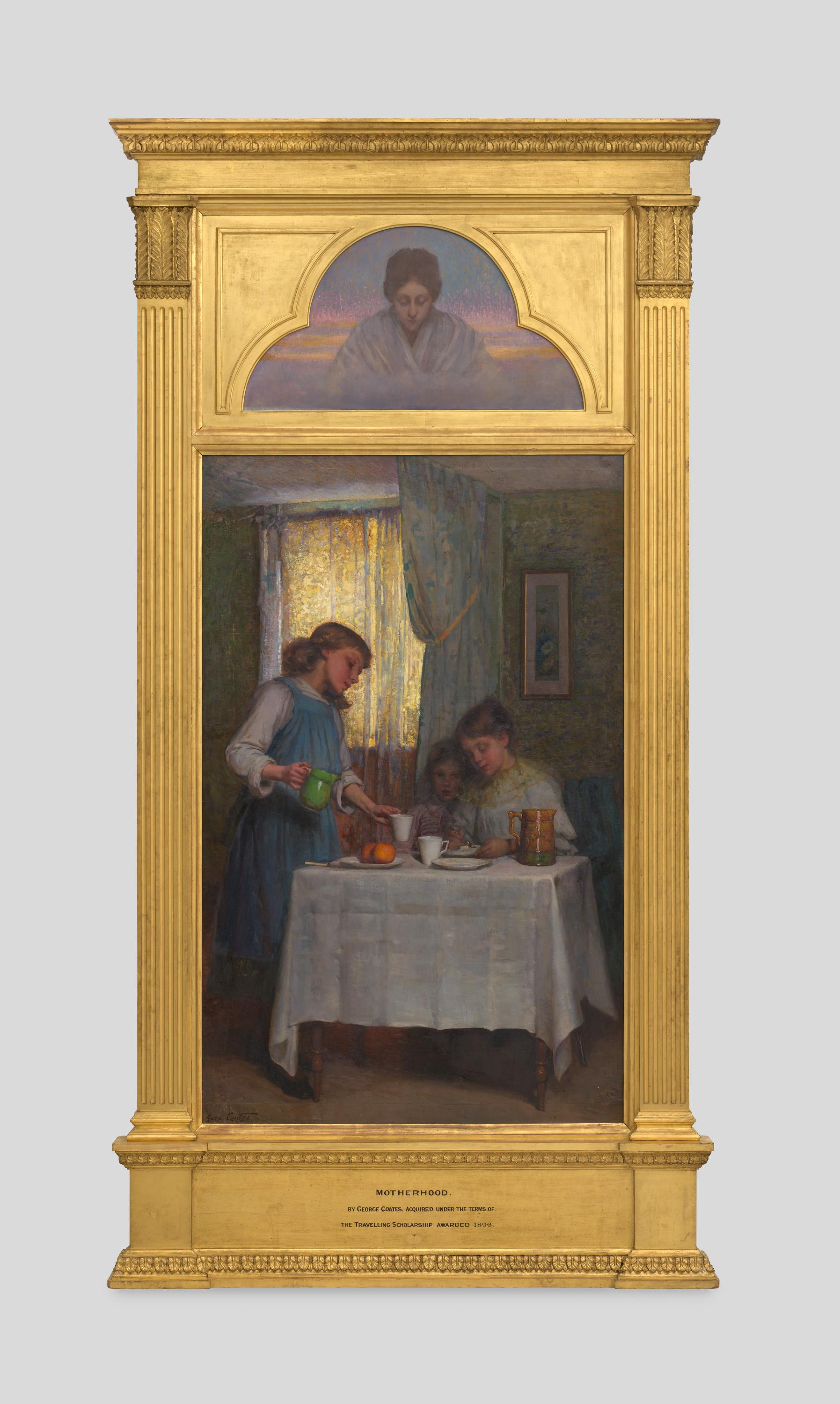
George Coates, Motherhood, 1903, National Gallery of Victoria, Melbourne

Coates was born in Emerald Hill (now South Melbourne, Victoria), to Irish-born Elizabeth, née Irwin, and artist-lithographer and bookbinder John Coates. In 1884 he was apprenticed, aged 15, to stained glass makers Ferguson and Urie, and enrolled at the National Gallery school, studying with James Quinn, Norman and Percy Lindsay, Max Meldrum, Bess Norriss, Dora Meeson, Hugh Ramsay, Leon Pole, Jo Sweatman, Portia Geach, James S. MacDonald, Rose McPherson (Margaret Preston), Ambrose Patterson, and others, under Frederick McCubbin and George Folingsby, where he won the Traveling Scholarship in 1896, with his future wife Dora Meeson coming second. The Bulletin described the work:

The triennial travelling scholarship offered to students at Melb. National Gallery falls this time to George Coates, for a picture somewhat reminiscent-of Longstaff’s Breaking the News. Coates gives a gloomy treatment of the prize subject At Last. A stockman, badly injured by a fall from his horse, lies upon a mattress in his hut. Fully dressed in moleskins, Crimean shirt, leggings, etc., the sufferer, with one leg drawn up convulsively, has a death-tinted face. Anxious wife in the background, and elderly male friend holding the groaner's wrist. Doctor hustling through the doorway. A strong work at the most important points, faulty in the background scheme, but fairly entitled to the prize. Miss Dora Meeson's cheerful picture of a miner bursting into his domestic circle with a nugget which he has just struck, takes second place from only three other competitors.

Previously Coates and Meeson competed in a poster competition on the theme of "Minerva," with Dora winning the prize. Meeson's family financed her studies in Paris and the couple planned to reunite on the other side of the world. Before leaving Australia George Bell took lessons from Coates in his studio and later in England socialised with him and Tom Roberts at the Chelsea Arts Club. With fellow graduate David Davies, an unsuccessful contender for the traveling scholarship, Coates sailed on the RMS Ophir for Europe. There George and Dora attended the Académie Julien in Paris, where her greater success was marked with a First Prize in the Concours de Torse d'Homme and Second Prize in the Concours de Torse de Femme in 1898.

A requirement of the Travelling Scholarship, which entitled Coates to a stipend of £150 per year (worth a modest A$25,080.00 at 2025) for three years studying abroad, was the production of works, particularly copies of Old Masters (for the edification of students in Australia where there were few originals) for the National Gallery of Victoria collections. He sent three works, all still held in the NGV; copies (now in poor condition and rarely shown) that he made at the Louvre after Antonio da Correggio’s mid-1520s painting, the Mystic Marriage of St Catherine with St Sebastian, and a van Dyck work Portrait of Jean Grusset Richardot and son c.1600–1625; and, as also required, an original work, being his 'altarpiece' to motherhood, in an elaborate and expensive frame in the form of a gilded Italian Renaissance tabernacle with classical mouldings and in a Symbolist mode.

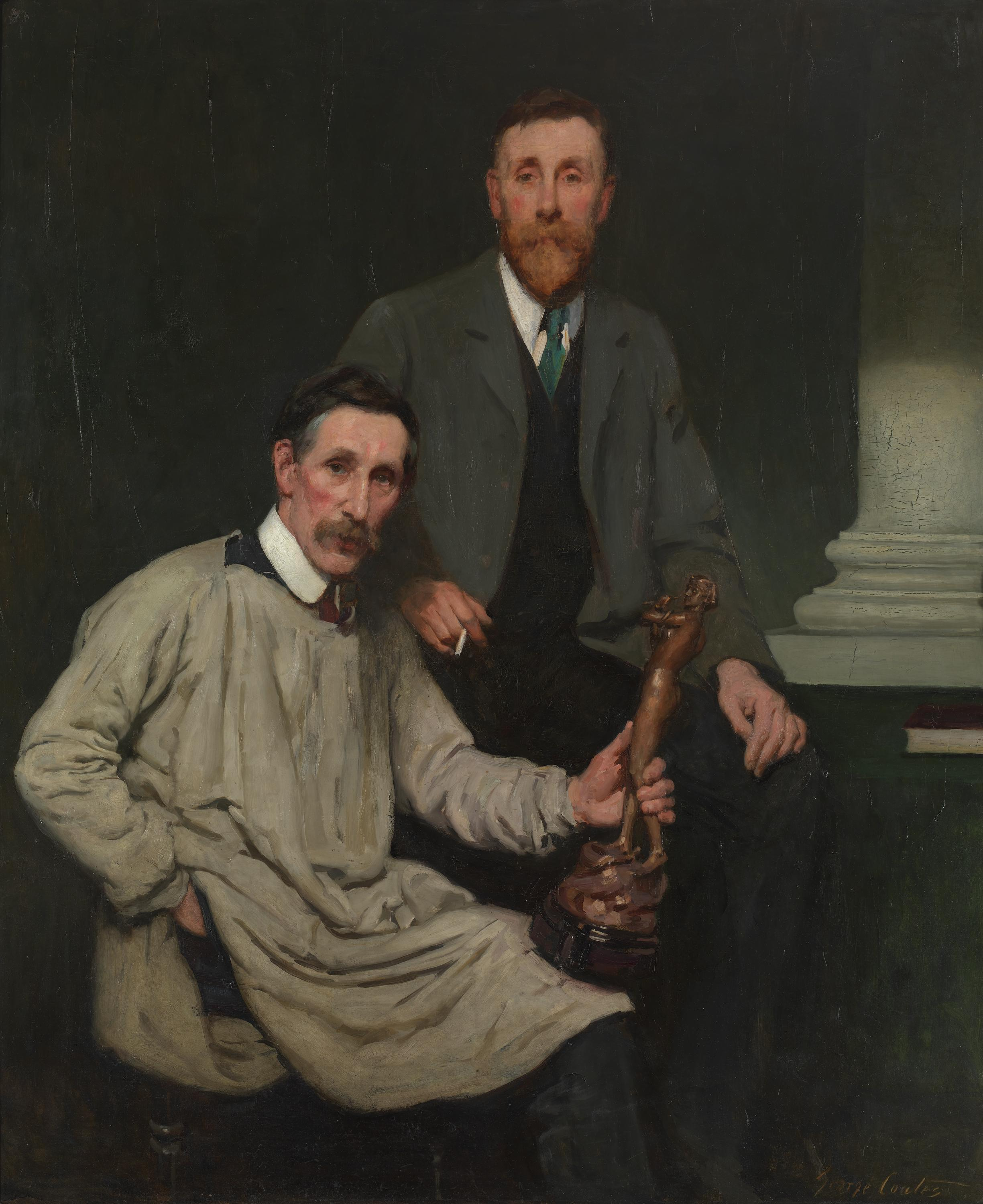
George Coates (1912) Arthur Walker and his brother Harold (The Walker Brothers), oil on canvas. National Gallery of Victoria, Melbourne

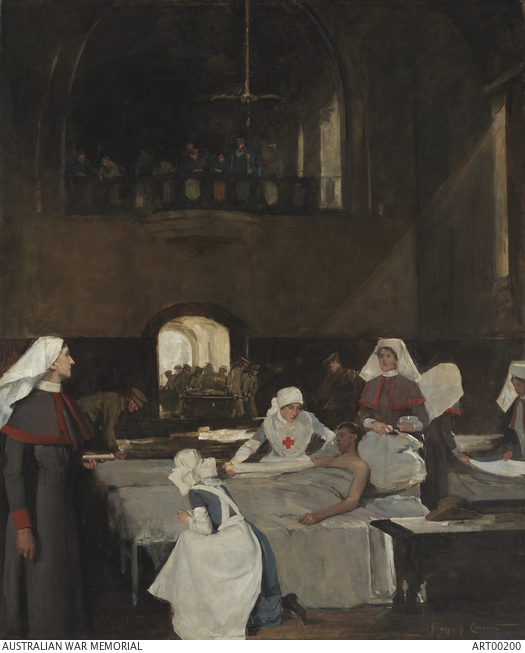
George Coates (c.1915–1921) First Australian wounded at Gallipoli arriving at Wandsworth Hospital, London. Australian War Memorial

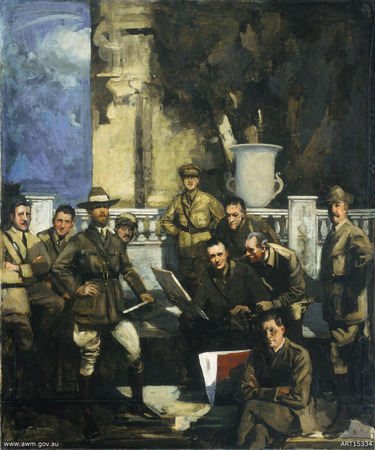
George Coates (1920) Australian official war artists, 1916-1918. Oil on canvas, 124.2 x 104.5 cm. Left to right: front — George Bell; standing — John Longstaff, Charles Bryant, George Washington Lambert, A. Henry Fullwood, James Quinn, H. Septimus Power, Arthur Streeton; and seated back — Will Dyson, Fred Leist.

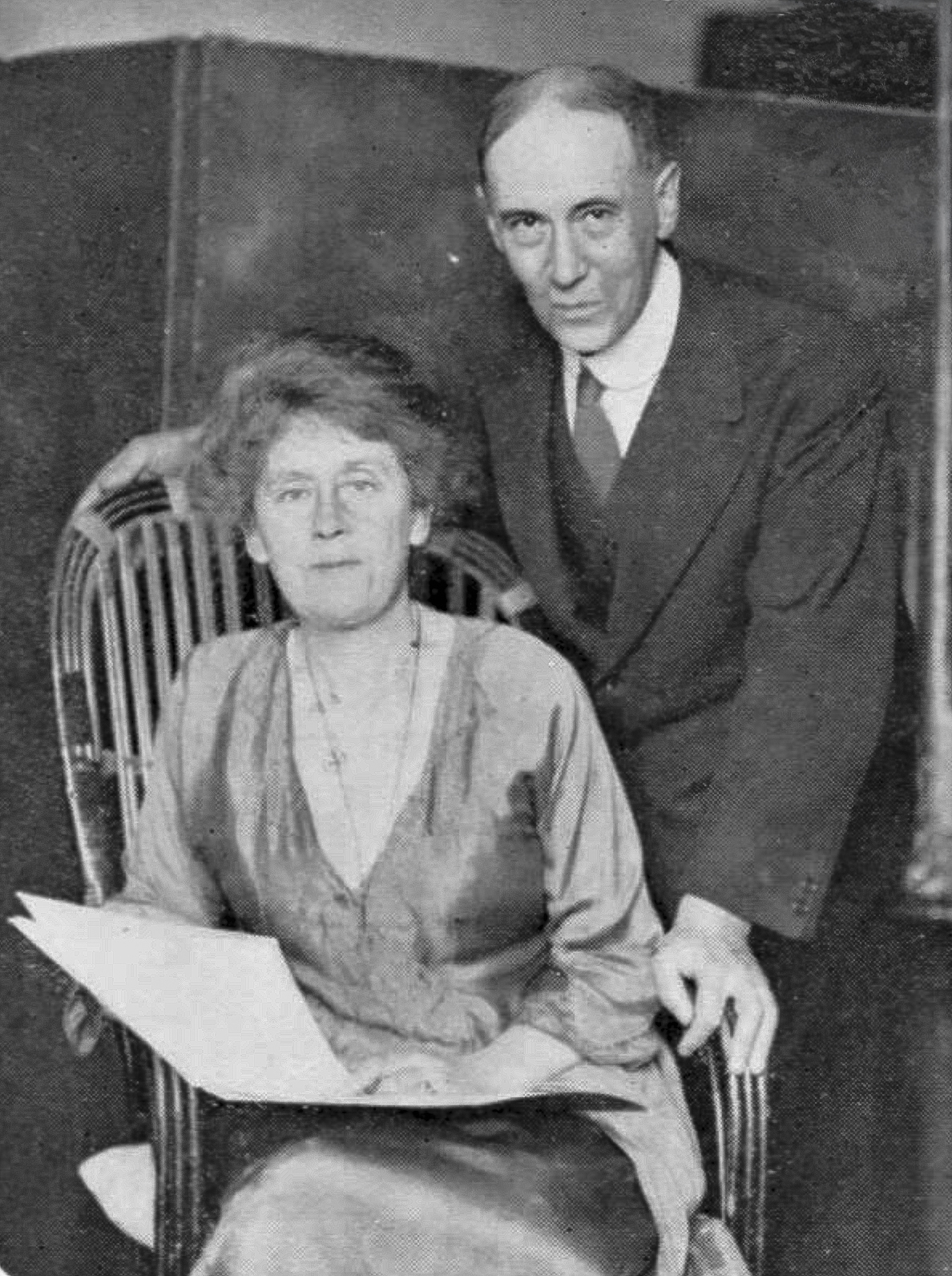
Pegg Clarke (1920) Portrait of Dora Meeson and George Coates, from The Home: An Australian Quarterly, 1 June 1921

== Career ==
The couple spent three years in Paris, encountering such artists as Fantin-Latour, Puvis de Chavannes, Auguste Renoir, Armand Guillaumin, and Auguste Rodin, and became friendly with dancer Loïe Fuller who later visited them in England. Until 1913 George's and Dora's work was exhibited regularly at the city's Salon (known as the Salon of the Champs Elysees) until its demise in 1909, after which Coates was elected an associate of the 'New Salon' (Société Nationale des Beaux-Arts).

In 1900, the couple returned to England and worked as illustrators for The Historians' History of the World and were married in 1903, after which they illustrated for the Encyclopædia Britannica, together earning six pounds a year. Coates showed at the Royal Academy, London in 1908. In 1909, they established their home in the artist colony of Chelsea, where Dora had her studio at No. 52 Glebe Place, while George's was at No. 55 (later occupied by Australian modernist artist Sidney Nolan), with a connecting door joining the two. Their neighbours were Mary and Ambrose McEvoy.

Meeson, who was actively involved, with Coates, in the suffragette movement, in her George Coates: His Art and His Life notes that they decided that "our pictures were to be our children, and had no sympathy with people who brought children into the world to starve or to be kept by other people".

A July 1914 article in The Lone Hand describes Coates' rise to success as a portrait on the strength of one work, a dual portrait of his portrait of sculptor Arthur Walker and his brother:

Painted in 1912, it was sent to the Academy, where it was hung on the line and was hailed as one of the portraits of the year. The artist has exhibited at the Old Salon since 1898, and this year...it was [mistakenly] sent to the New Salon, which is more exclusive, [and] on the strength of this work, he [was] made an Associate of the Salon...He is the third Australian to receive the honor, the other two being Lambert and Fox. Since the portrait of the Walker Brothers attracted attention at the Academy, there has been a run of commissions [from] Lord and Lady Courtney of Penwith; Cicely Hamilton, the authoress of Diana of Dobson's and other plays; Miss Christine Silver, the actress, who was the original Fanny in Fanny's First Play; Mr. C. D. Wetham, F.E.S., lecturer at Oxford University; and Mrs. Richard Coulthurst, daughter-in-law of Sir George Coulthurst, the owner of the famous Blarney Castle, [which] was on the line at this year's Academy.

During World War I, Coates worked as an orderly, with Arthur Streeton, Tom Roberts, and Francis Derwent Wood, at the 3rd London General Hospital, Hospital, Wandsworth. In 1916, he made studies for his 1920 painting Casualty clearing station (Australian War Memorial, Canberra), and Catherine Speck argues that his First Australian Wounded at Gallipoli Arriving at Wandsworth Hospital, London (oil on canvas, from 1916 sketches, donated to the Australian War Memorial in 1921) reveals a wartime reordering of authority between male patients and the women overseeing their care and captures the hierarchical layering of women’s roles within the British medical services where in Wandsworth, as he shows, English army nurses were less inclined to undertake direct bedside duties than their Australian counterparts.

In 1919, Coates was appointed official war artist to make portraits for the Australian War Records section and undertook commissions also for the Canadian War Office. Of the making of his group portrait Australian official war artists 1916-1918, reproduced in Art in Australia in May 1937, Meeson's recollection is quoted:

It was difficult to get any of them to sit decently for him. He only had Lambert to pose standing for a few minutes; for Streeton he had to go up to his studio in St. John's Wood to do his head; Longstaff also could only give two short afternoon sittings, and Quinn less. He usually did a life-size head study, and then copied it into the group in proportion.

In 1921 the couple returned to Melbourne for a year and exhibited together at the Athenaeum Gallery, and at Exton's Galleries Brisbane, while George presented his work to the War Records Office, and showed with the Australian Art Association. In 1923 Princess Marie Louise, cousin of King George V invited George and Dora, with Agnes Goodsir and Bess Norriss, to paint miniatures for Queen Mary's Dolls' House the world's largest. In all, Coates spent thirty-six years, 60% of his life, in Europe.

== Style ==
Art historian Richard Haese classes Coates as primarily a portrait painter specialising in war subjects until his death in 1930. Dr Ane Gray, Head of Australian Art, National Gallery of Australia 2001–2016 frames him as "an assiduous, even obsessive painter [who] remained faithful to his essentially representative approach."

Leslie Rees, who met Coates a few months before he died suddenly of a stroke on 27 July 1930, aged 60, provides in The Bulletin of May 1937, this account of Coates' style:

The best of his portraits had a sensitiveness, a tonal delicacy, that took you to Whistler. They were extremely low in key. Coates liked his pictures to have the sombre maturity of aspect of old masters, not the blithe, often strident, juxtaposition of pure colours which fills exhibition galleries to-day. He loved dark and velvety backgrounds, into the dimness of which his figures might be merged by almost imperceptible light-gradation. His surfaces were luminous and filmy. There were, in the rarer vintage of his work, a modesty, grace and simplicity of a kind not at present admired by painters but which will no doubt return to fashion. Here was no genius, but an accomplished hand, and a mind essentially distilled of the tawdry opportunism which must be the portraitist's temptation. His pencil drawings showed fine sensitivity. His painting of the Australian war artists...belongs to his broader middle period, and is a model of well-handled composition.

Meeson who, around 1913, was producing impressionist paintings of the Thames near their Chelsea home, in her biography of Coates writes about their contrasting styles and approaches:

I found it difficult to work in George’s studio. He generally…painted from preference in a low key with a subdued light…I could not see in the light that suited him...he always wanted me to lower my work in tone, whereas I would urge him to lighten his. But we went our separate ways quite harmoniously. The crampedness of painting and living in a studio drove me out to study the river and the multitudinous forms of water,...while George concentrated more and more on figure painting, and portraiture especially.

== Selected exhibitions ==
- 1921: joint show with Dora Meeson, Athenaeum Gallery, Melbourne
- 1921, September: Exton's Galleries Brisbane.
- 1921, November: Australian Art Association.
- 1924, October: Adelaide Artists' Week Exhibition
- 1929, December: Royal Institute of Oil Painters, Piccadilly

=== Posthumous ===
- 1931: Memorial exhibition, New Burlington Galleries, London
- 2005, 6 April–24 July: Included in 19th century Australian watercolours, drawings & pastels. Art Gallery Of New South Wales
- 13 December 1997 – 15 March 1998: Included in Australian drawings from the Gallery's collection. Art Gallery Of New South Wales
- 1992, 11 January–8 November: Included in Contemporary Australian Drawings - from the collection. Art Gallery Of New South Wales touring to multiple venues
- 1990, 18 August–28 October: Included in The portrait and the nude: Australian drawings from the collection. Art Gallery Of New South Wales
- 2008, 17 October–30 November: Included in Themes and Variations: Australian drawings from the collection. Art Gallery of New South Wales, Bathurst Regional Art Gallery

== Collections ==
- Art Gallery of New South Wales
- National Gallery of Victoria, Melbourne
- Art Gallery of South Australia
- Queensland Art Gallery & Gallery of Modern Art
- Art Gallery of Western Australia
- Bendigo Art Gallery
- Art Gallery of Ballarat
- Geelong Gallery
- Castlemaine Art Museum
- Australian war museum, Canberra.

== Works ==
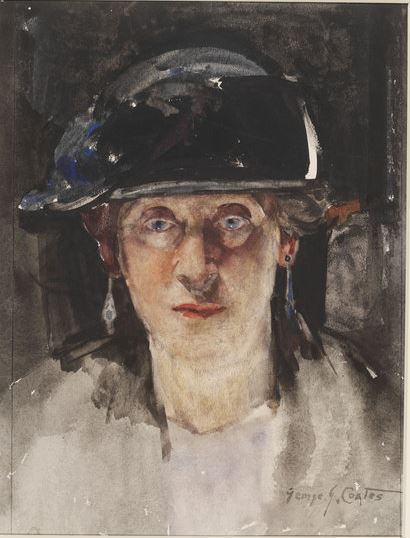
Dora Meeson Coates, Wife of the Artist (1920)

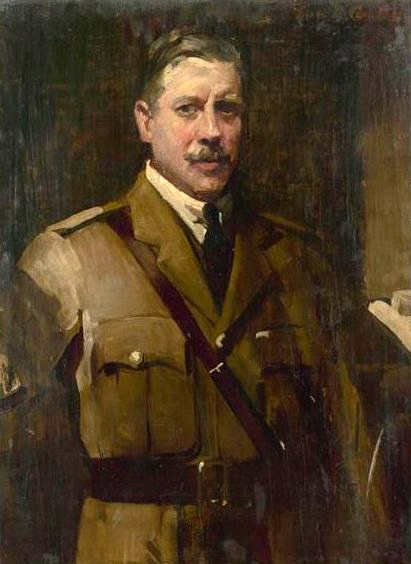
John Longstaff (1918)

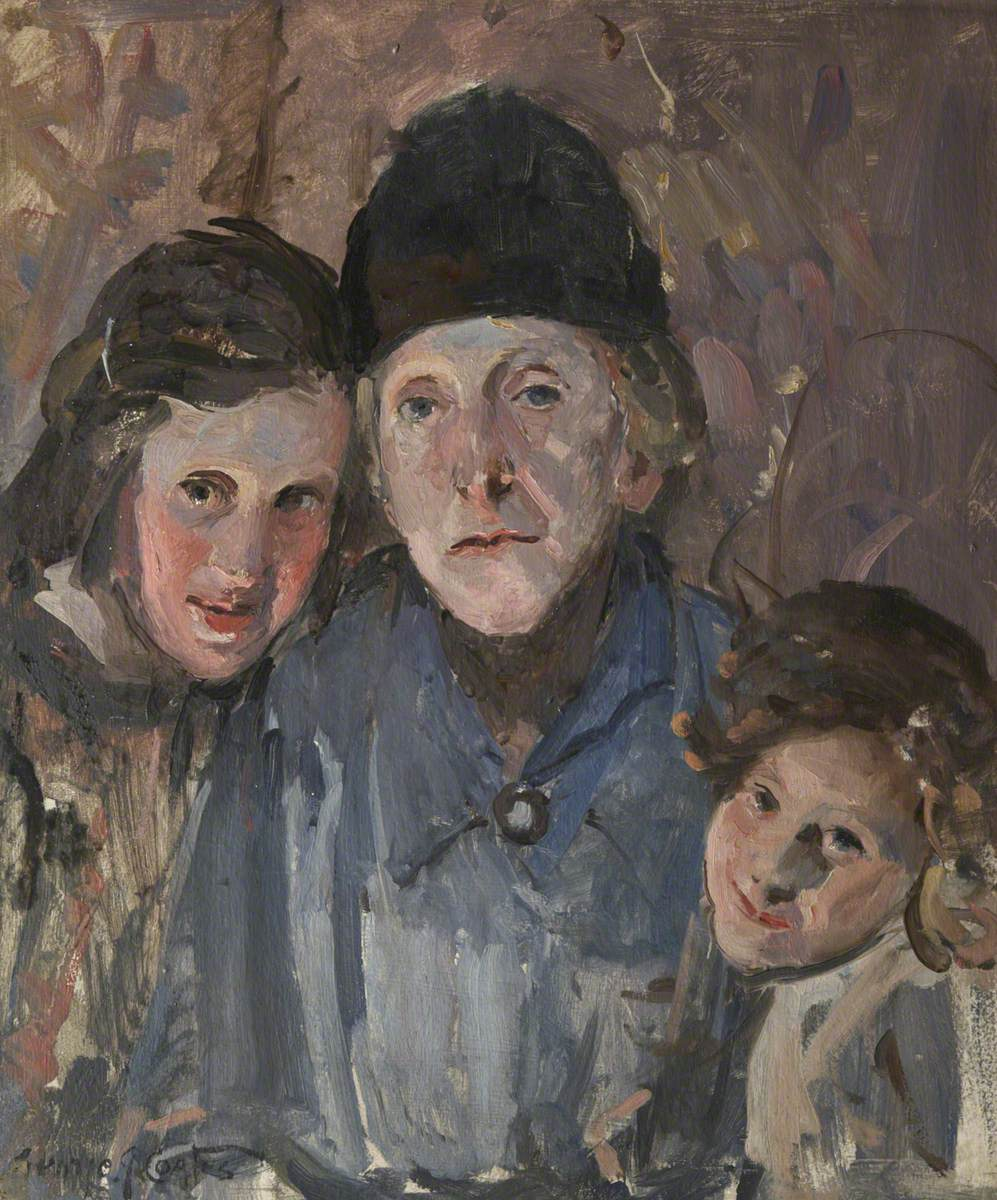
Nurse and Two Children

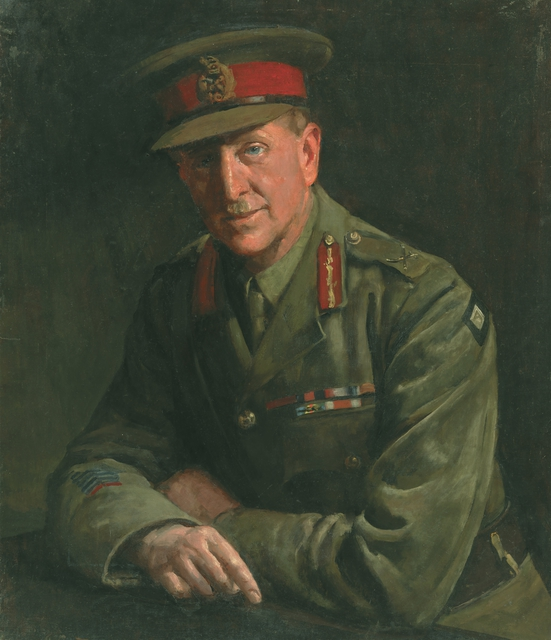
Cecil Foott (1921)

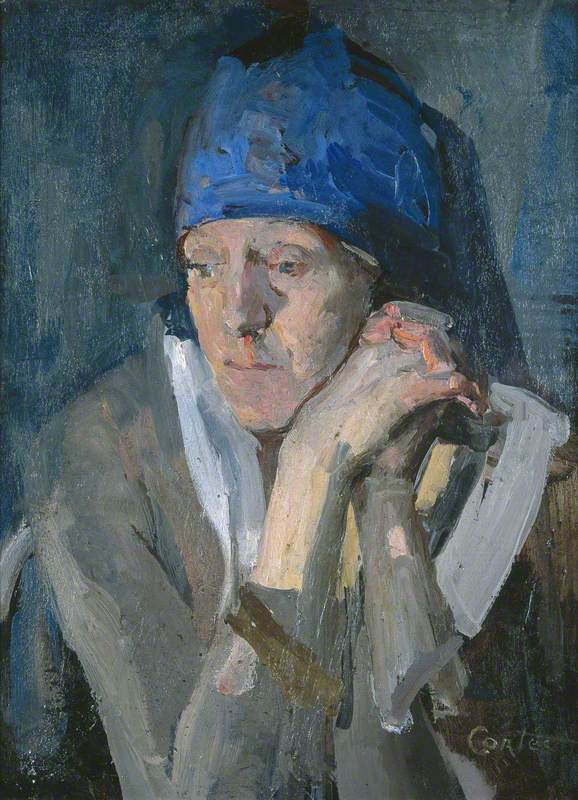
Memories (1926)

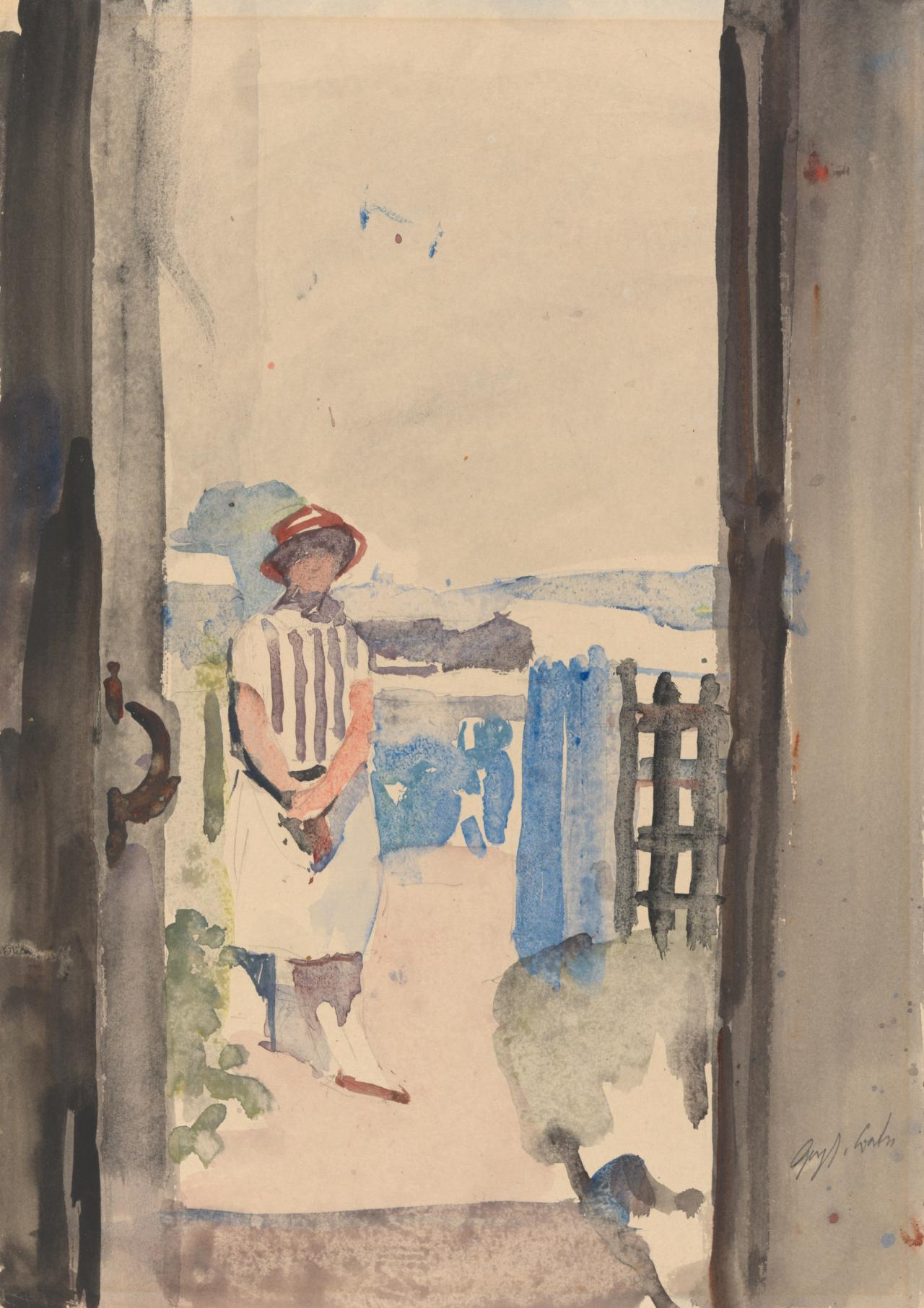
George Coates. Woman standing in garden, seen from doorway c. 1925

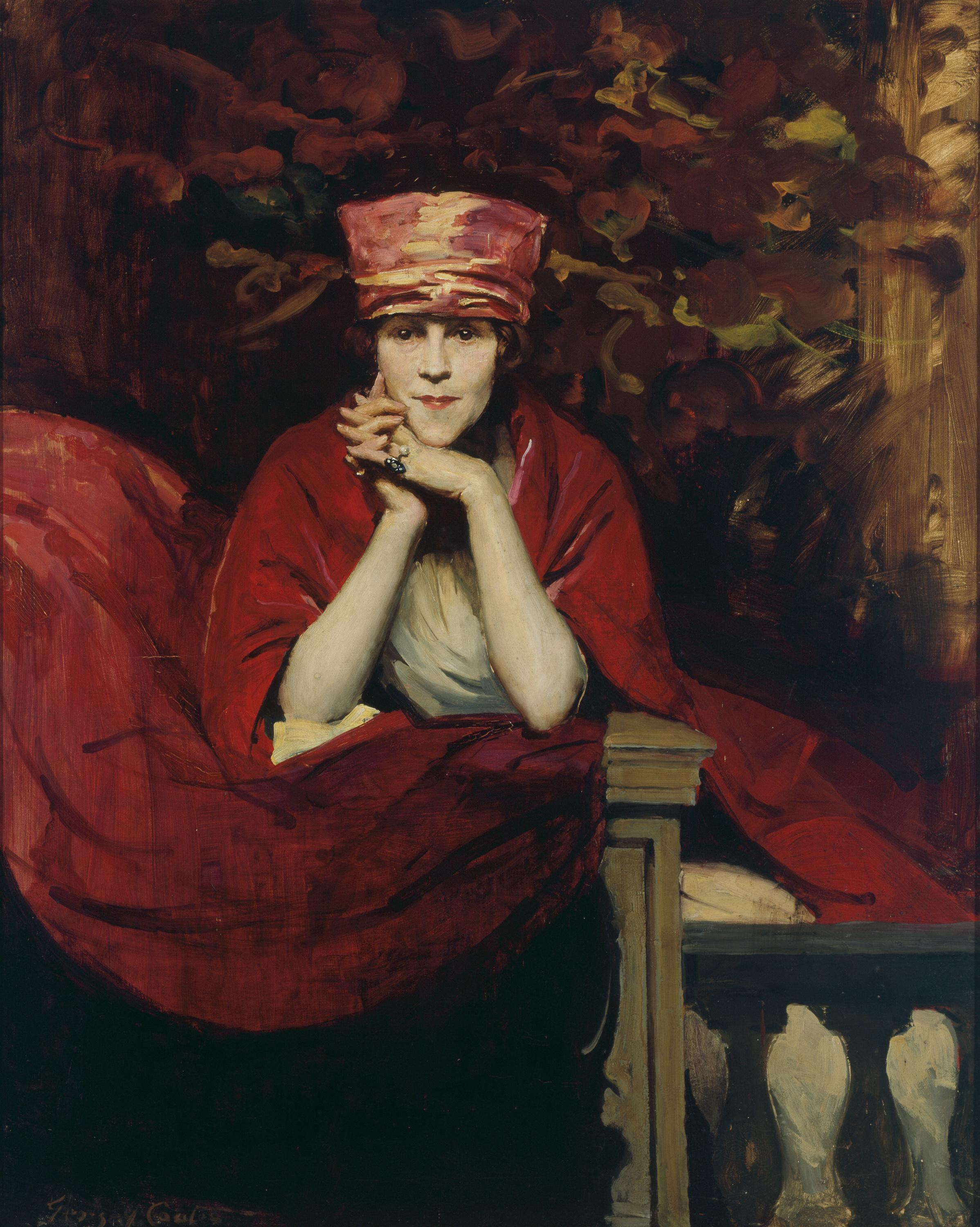
George Coates (1925) A Russian Woman

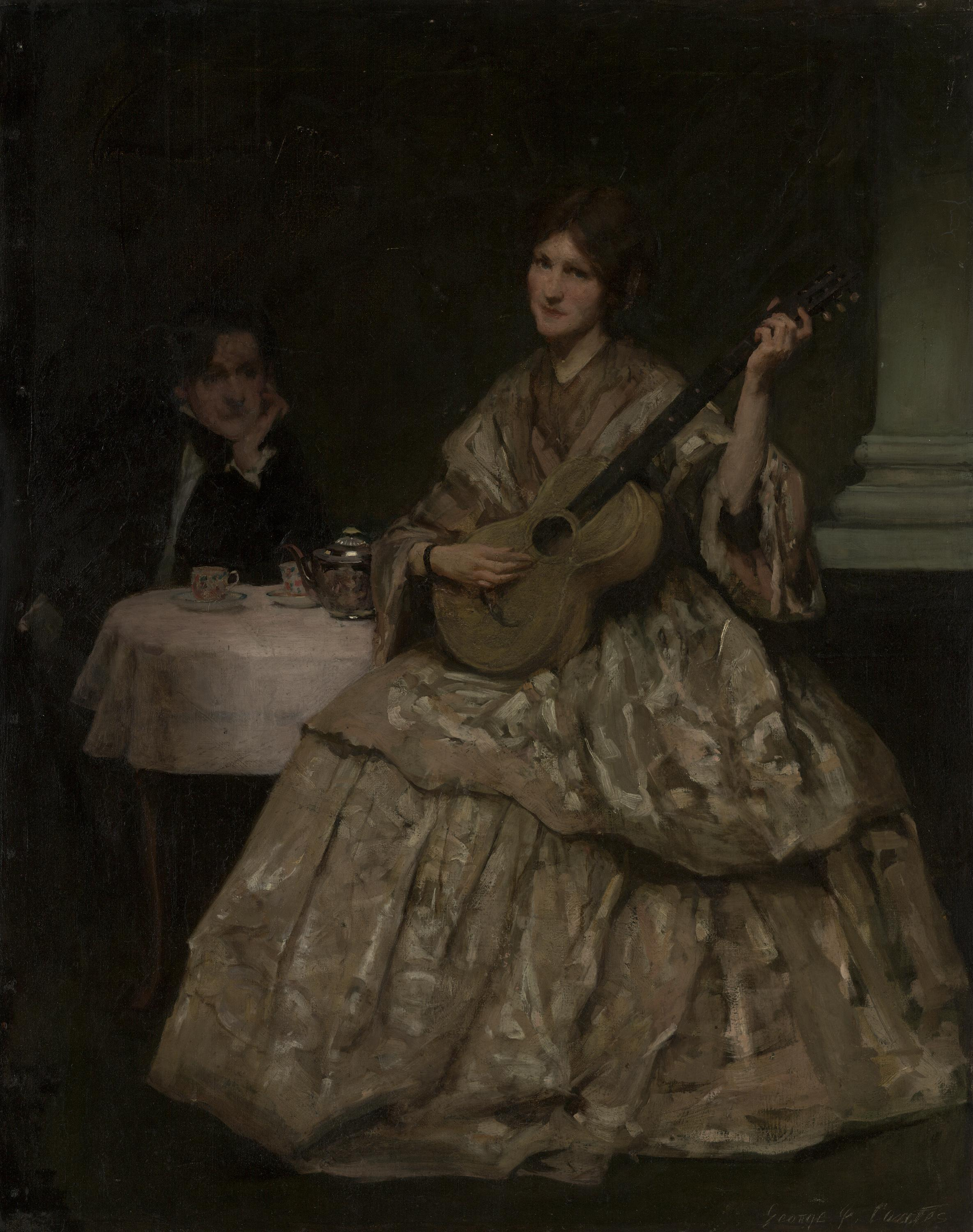
George Coates, Early Victorians, 1911, National Gallery of Victoria, Melbourne. Felton Bequest, 1921

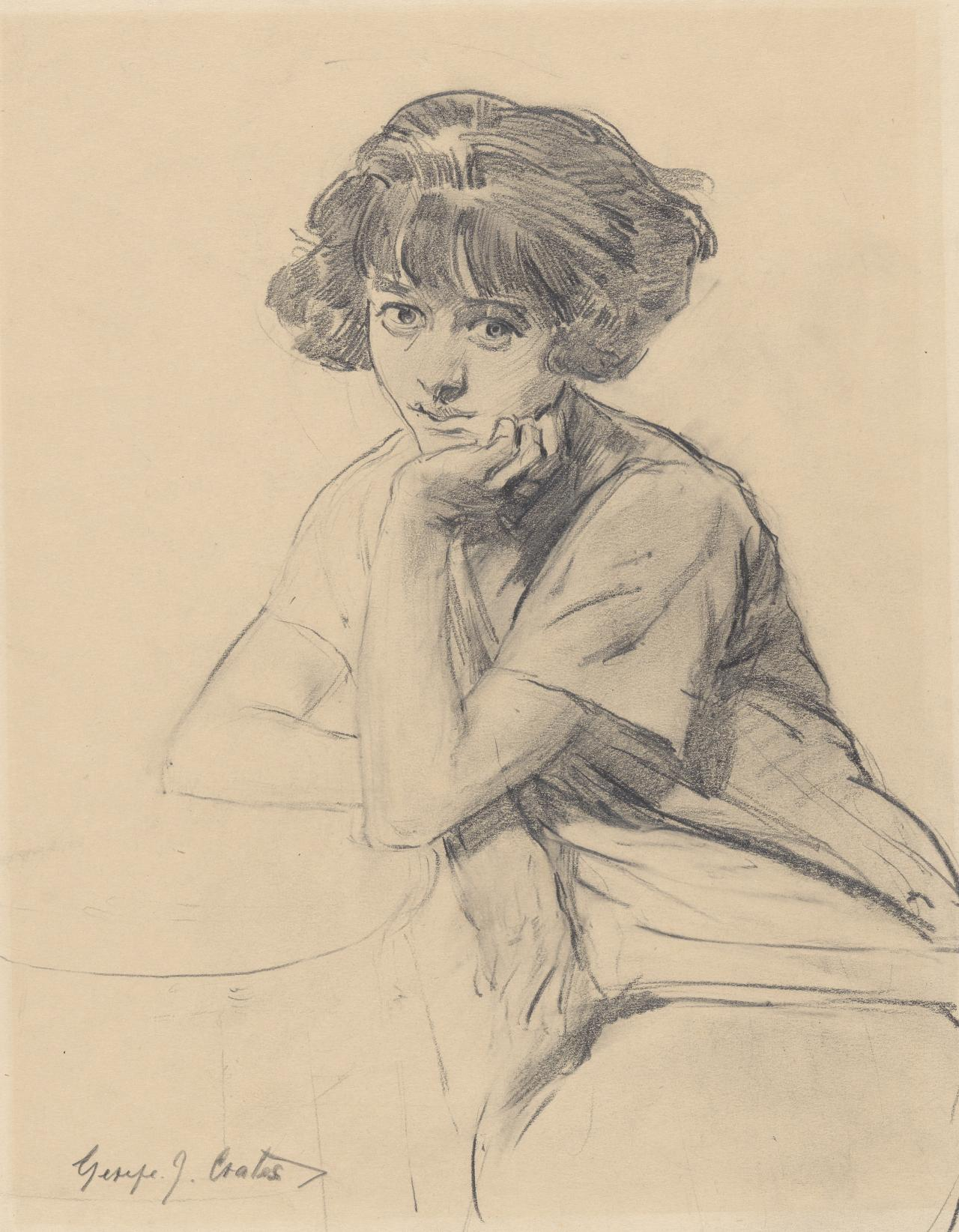
George Coates "Pensive", pencil, National Gallery of Victoria, Melbourne Felton Bequest, 1932

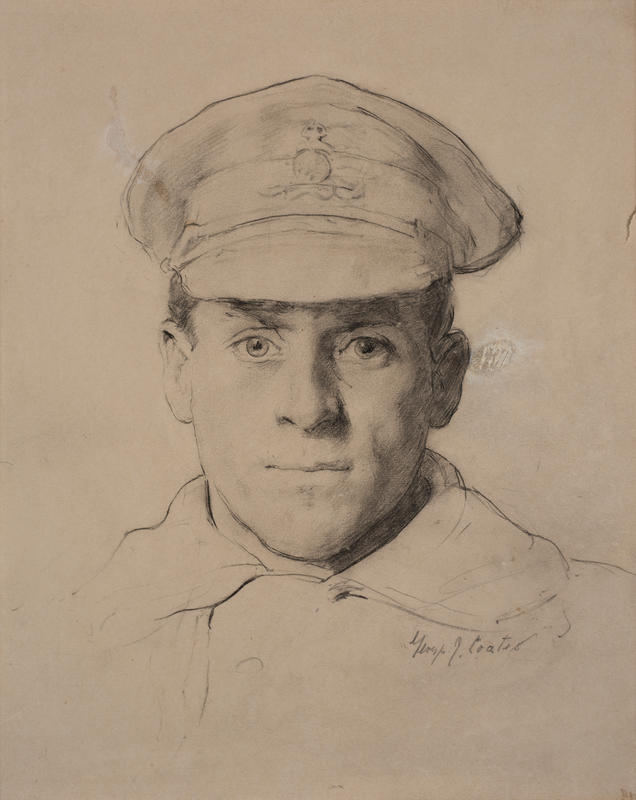
George Coates (1918) A Hero from Mons, pencil drawing. Castlemaine Art Museum. Gift of the artist 1926

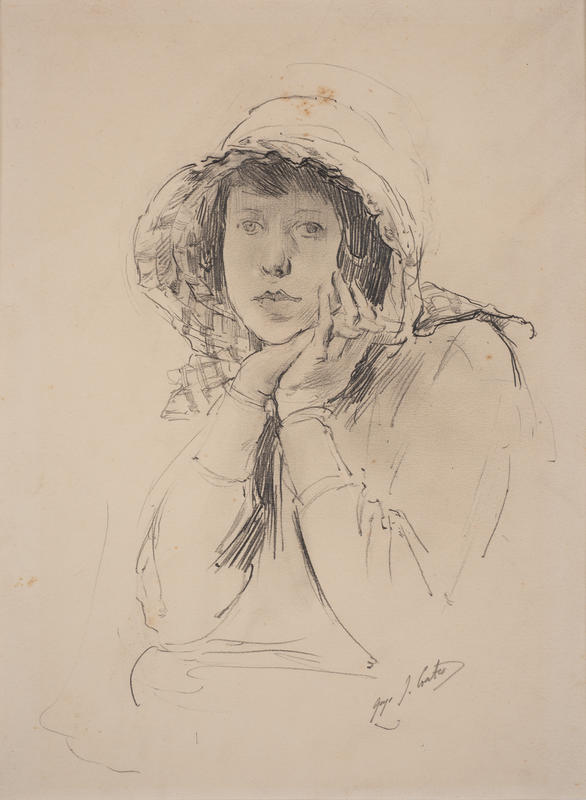
George Coates. Untitled, undated (Portrait of a Girl), pencil on paper. Castlemaine Art Museum

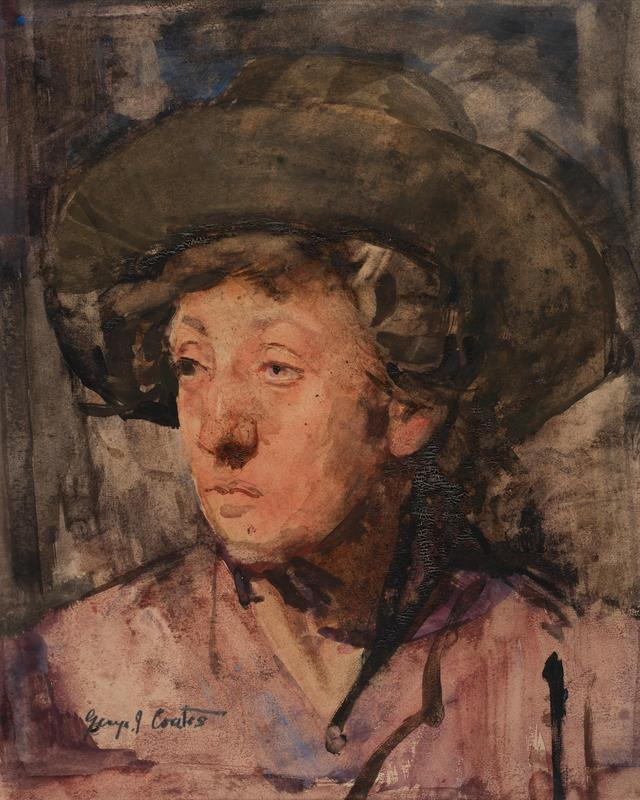
George James Coates, undated "The Housekeeper", watercolour. Castlemaine Art Museum. Gift of Dora Meeson 1934

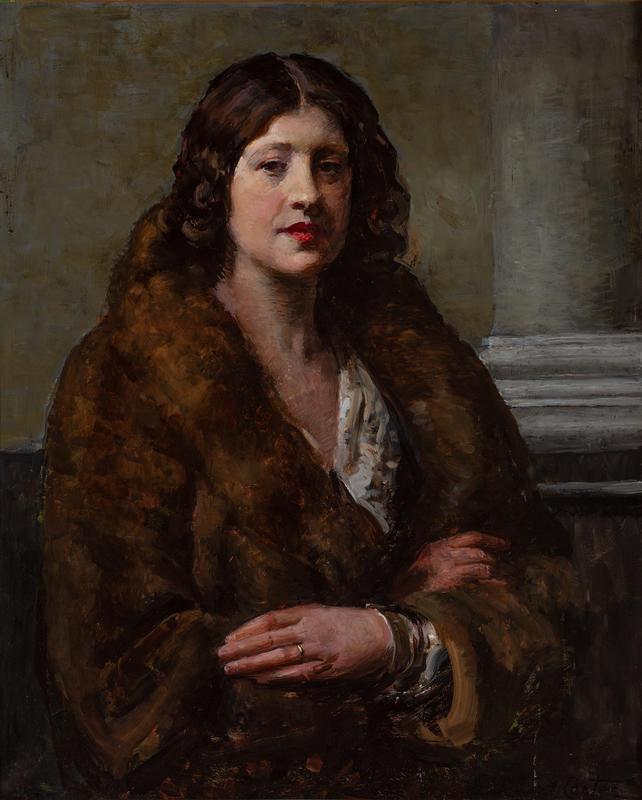
George James Coates (c.1920s) A Belgian Lady. Oil on canvas. Castlemaine Art Museum. Gifted by Dora Meeson 1934

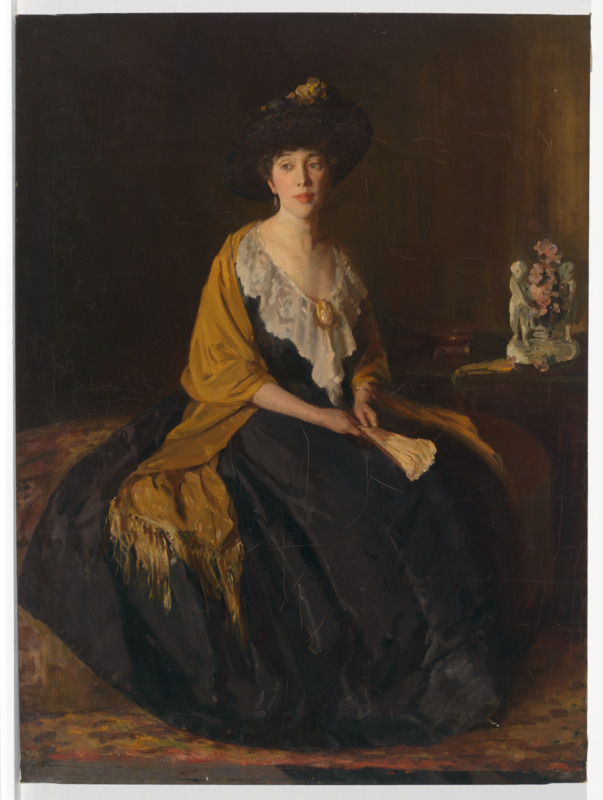
George Coates (c.1905) Portrait of a Lady (Miss Griffiths), oil on canvas. National Gallery of Australia

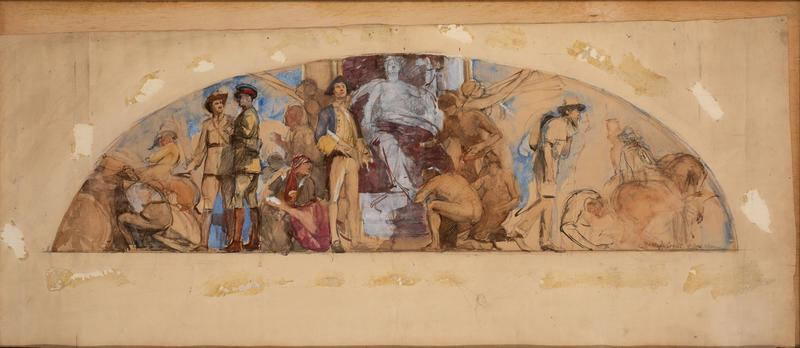
George Coates sketch for "The Apotheosis of Australia" watercolour and pencil. Castlemaine Art Museum
