= EJH =

EJH may refer to:

- The airport code of Al Wajh Domestic Airport
- The initials of Emily J. Harding, used to sign some of her paintings and illustrations.
- Ned Eckersley, cricketer, often referred to as E. J. H. Eckersley on scorecards.
- EJH Corner
