= Dora Meeson =

Australian artist (1869–1955)

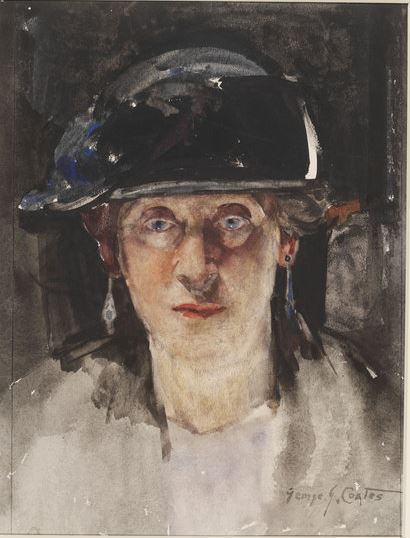
- Portrait by her husband, George James Coates
- Born: 7 August 1869; Hawthorn, Victoria, Australia
- Died: 24 March 1955 (aged 85); Chelsea, London, England
- Education: Canterbury College School of Art National Gallery School c.1896-c.1898 Slade School of Fine Art 1898–1899 Académie Julian
- Known for: painter
- Spouse: George James Coates
- Elected: ROI in 1919

Dora Meeson (7 August 1869 – 24 March 1955) was an Australian artist, suffragist, and an elected member of the Royal Institute of Oil Painters in London, England. She was a member of the British Artists' Suffrage League.

== Early life and education ==
Dora Meeson was born on 7 August 1869 to Amelia (née Kipling) and John Meeson in Hawthorn, Victoria. Her father, an English schoolmaster, had moved to Melbourne in 1860 and married Amelia Kipling in 1861. He established Hawthorn Grammar School and sold it around 1880 before relocating the family to London. There, he studied law and eventually became a barrister.

In London, the Meeson family then moved to Dunedin, New Zealand c. 1879. It was during this time that Dora Meeson began her artistic career. Also, while studying at the Canterbury College School of Art, Meeson was witness to the suffrage movement and signed the petition which was forwarded to the New Zealand Parliament. She attended the Slade School in London, studying under Henry Tonks and alongside notable fellow student Augustus John. In 1895, she applied for special entry to the painting classes at the National Gallery School in Melbourne. Despite not having completed the usual apprenticeship in the Drawing classes, she was accepted as an advanced student by the Master, Bernard Hall and the family returned to Melbourne later in 1895, enabling Meeson to study therel.

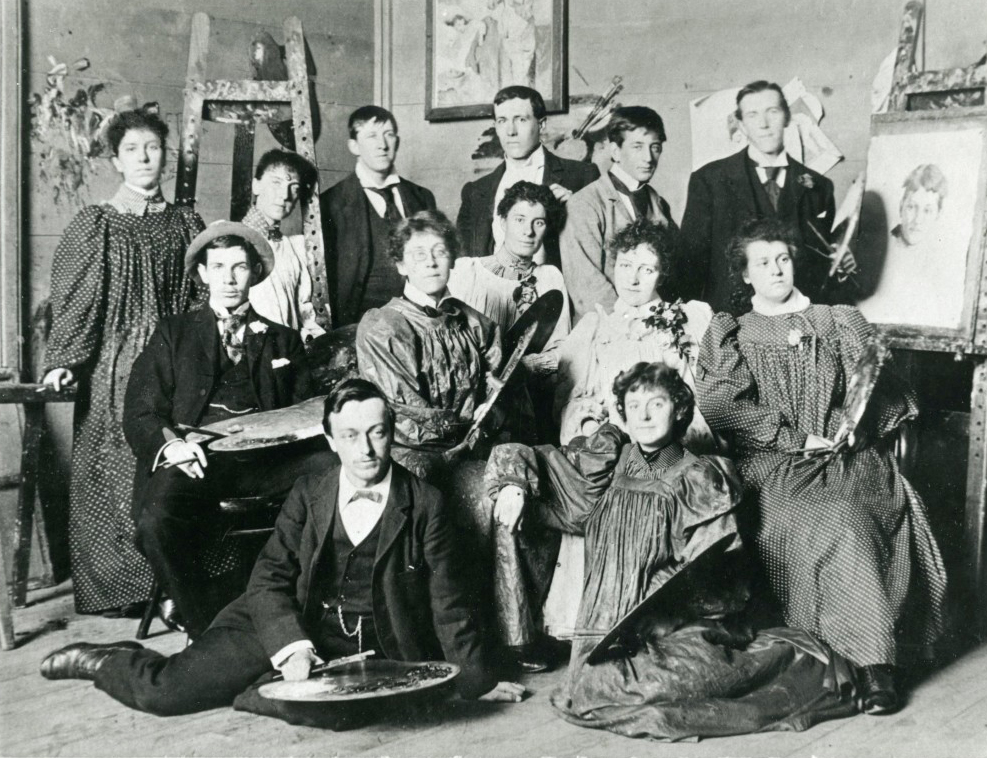
National Gallery of Victoria Art School students in 1896, with Dora Meeson in middle row second from left, and George Coates in back row, 4th from left.

At the National Gallery School, Dora met her future husband, George Coates. They both participated in a poster competition on the theme of "Minerva," with Dora Meeson winning the prize. Coates and Meeson both contended for a scholarship to study at the Académie Julian in Paris. Ultimately, Coates received the scholarship and Meeson did not, and her family financed her studies in Paris. They planned to reunite on the other side of the world.

George Coates and David Davies travelled to London, while the Meeson family coincidentally returned to live in London in the same year. Dora and George then journeyed to Paris, where they enrolled at Julian's School of Art under the tutelage of Jean Paul Laurens and Benjamin Constant. They spent three years in Paris, immersing themselves in the art scene and admiring the works of prominent artists such as Fantin-Latour, Puvis de Chavannes, Auguste Renoir, Armand Guillaumin, and Auguste Rodin. Dora Meeson particularly felt a sense of belonging in Paris and was impressed by Claude Monet's exhibition showcasing various atmospheric effects of Rouen Cathedral.

Dora made significant progress at Julian's, winning First Prize in the Concours de Torse d'Homme and Second Prize in the Concours de Torse de Femme in 1898, while Coates received no awards that time. In 1899, both Dora and George had their works exhibited at the Paris Old Salon.

== Career ==
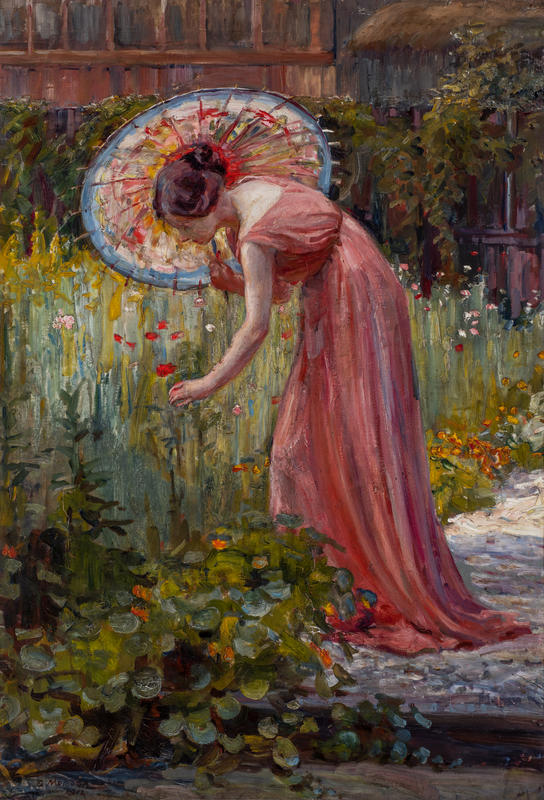
In a Chelsea Garden by Dora Meeson, 1912.

In 1900, the couple returned to England with the intention of getting married, but Dora's parents were skeptical about their ability to sustain themselves financially through art. George found work as an illustrator for The Historians' History of the World, and in 1902, Dora joined him in this endeavor. They attended the wedding of E. Phillips Fox and Ethel Carrick, and in 1903, Dora and George were married in the same church in Ealing. They had difficulties breaking into the art world there, and early on gained income through producing small illustrations for encyclopedias.

From 1903 to 1905, they resided in Ealing, where Dora received an annual allowance of £100 and taught a few students, though they suffered privation and isolation from the art world. They often employed children as models due to their affordability and willingness. Dora expressed her fondness for England as a place of pleasure and Paris as a place of work and expressed interest in the more avant-garde work practised there, while George felt like an outsider in Paris.

In 1906, Augustus John (with whom she had studied at the Slade) convinced Dora and George to rent a studio at Trafalgar Studios in Chelsea. This marked the beginning of their long stay in Chelsea, where they became part of a vibrant art community that included many Australian artists. Notable figures like Charles Conder and members of the Chelsea Arts Club, such as Tom Roberts, Will Dyson, and George Lambert, frequented Trafalgar Studios.

During their time in Chelsea, Dora attended a suffrage meeting addressed by Emily Pankhurst in another studio within their building, inspiring her to become actively involved in the suffrage movement, while George joined the Men's League for Women's Suffrage. They participated in processions together, and some members of the Chelsea Arts Club affectionately nicknamed them "Coates and Trousers."

In 1909, both of Dora's parents died, which, although a great shock, provided them with a higher degree of financial independence. They established their home and Dora's studio at No. 52 Glebe Place, while George had a spacious studio at No. 55 (later occupied by Australian modernist artist Sidney Nolan) with a connecting door between the two. Dora began painting the Thames, a subject she deeply cherished, in a post-impressionist style.

Meeson and Coates conducted their art careers in England. In 1903 they were employed as illustrators for the Encyclopædia Britannica, together earning six pounds a year. In 1921 they made a successful visit to Australia, and organised exhibitions of their works in Melbourne, Ballarat, Geelong, Adelaide and Perth.

== Women's suffrage ==
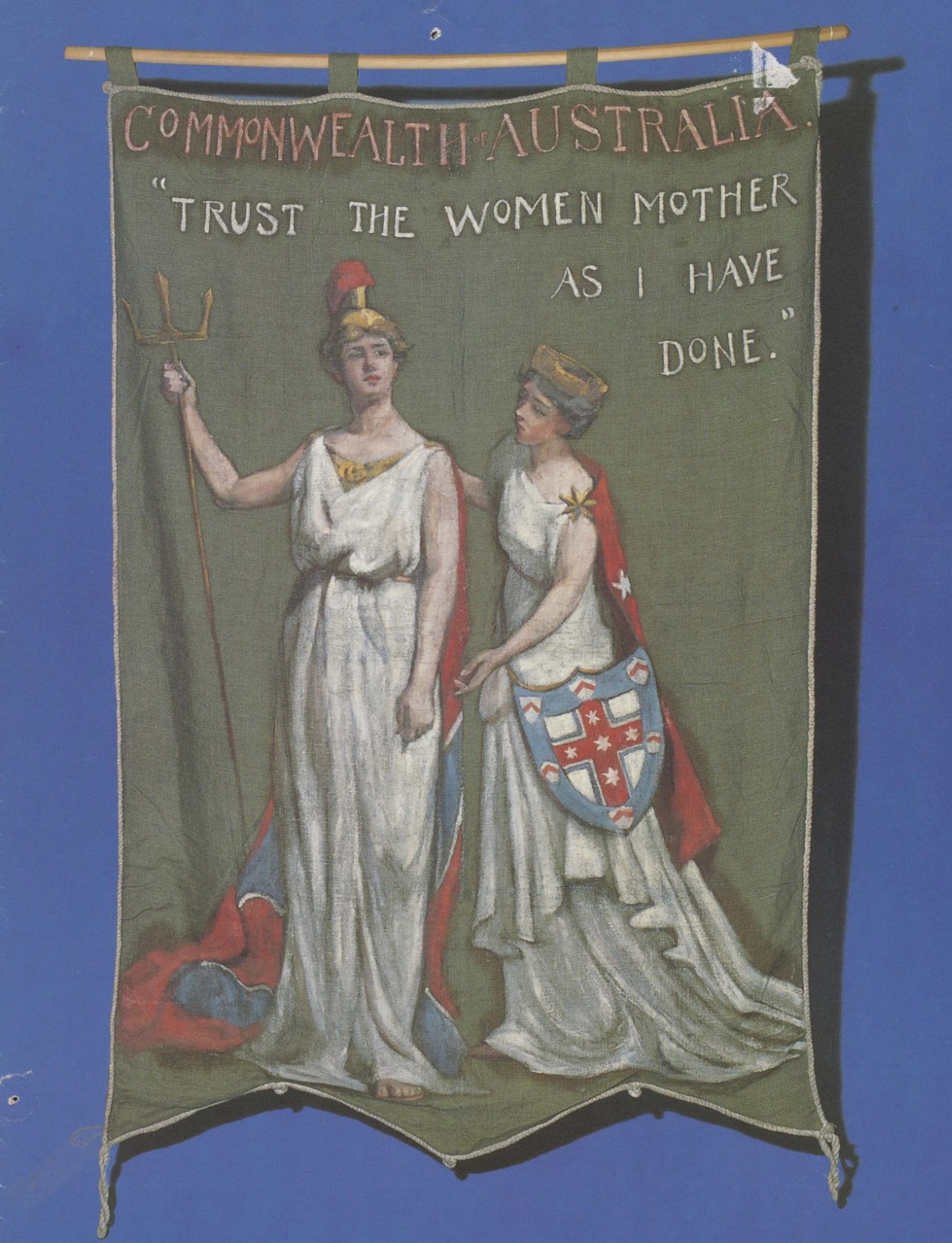
Dora Meeson (1908) The women's suffrage banner, oil paint on green hessian ground, Official Gifts Collection, Parliament House Art Collections

Following the death of her parents, Meeson gained momentum with the suffrage movement, and became a founding member of the Kensington branch of the Women's Freedom League.

In January 1907, the Artists' Suffrage League was established with Meeson an early member, making significant artistic contributions through her production of political posters, banners and postcards from the league's studio in The King's Road. She created The women’s suffrage banner which accompanied a 10,000 women on their march to London’s Albert Hall in 1908 and which is now in Parliament House in Canberra. On it, ‘daughter’ Australia as Minerva, goddess of wisdom, represented with the Commonwealth Coat of Arms, is imploring ‘mother’ Britannia to "Trust the Women Mother as I have done" and thus to grant women’s suffrage. Under the Commonwealth Franchise Act, Australia had already given women the vote in 1902. The inner was also displayed on 17 June 1911 in the Women’s Coronation Procession in London. Meeson also illustrated booklets that were sold to increase visibility for the cause and promote awareness along with Cicely Hamilton, Mary Lowndes, and C. Hedley Charlton. Meeson's postcards were in high demand, with 6,488 sold at a penny each.

In May 1911 Vida Goldstein encouraged Meeson and others to form the Australian and New Zealand Women Voters' Committee (London), for the purpose of applying political pressure for voting rights and women's rights.

On 17 June 1911 at 5:30pm the Women's Suffrage Coronation Procession was held in London. Vida Goldstein, Margaret Fisher, and Emily McGowen led the Australian contingent with Meeson's banner, Commonwealth of Australia. "Trust the Women Mother as I have done" carried by Meeson and supported by her husband at the front of the Australian and New Zealand contingent. The banner was purchased from the Women's Library by the National Women's Consultative Council as a Bicentennial Gift to the Women of Australia in 1988. It can be viewed in Parliament House, Canberra.

With the onset of World War I, Meeson helped establish and subsequently participated in the Women's Police Service.

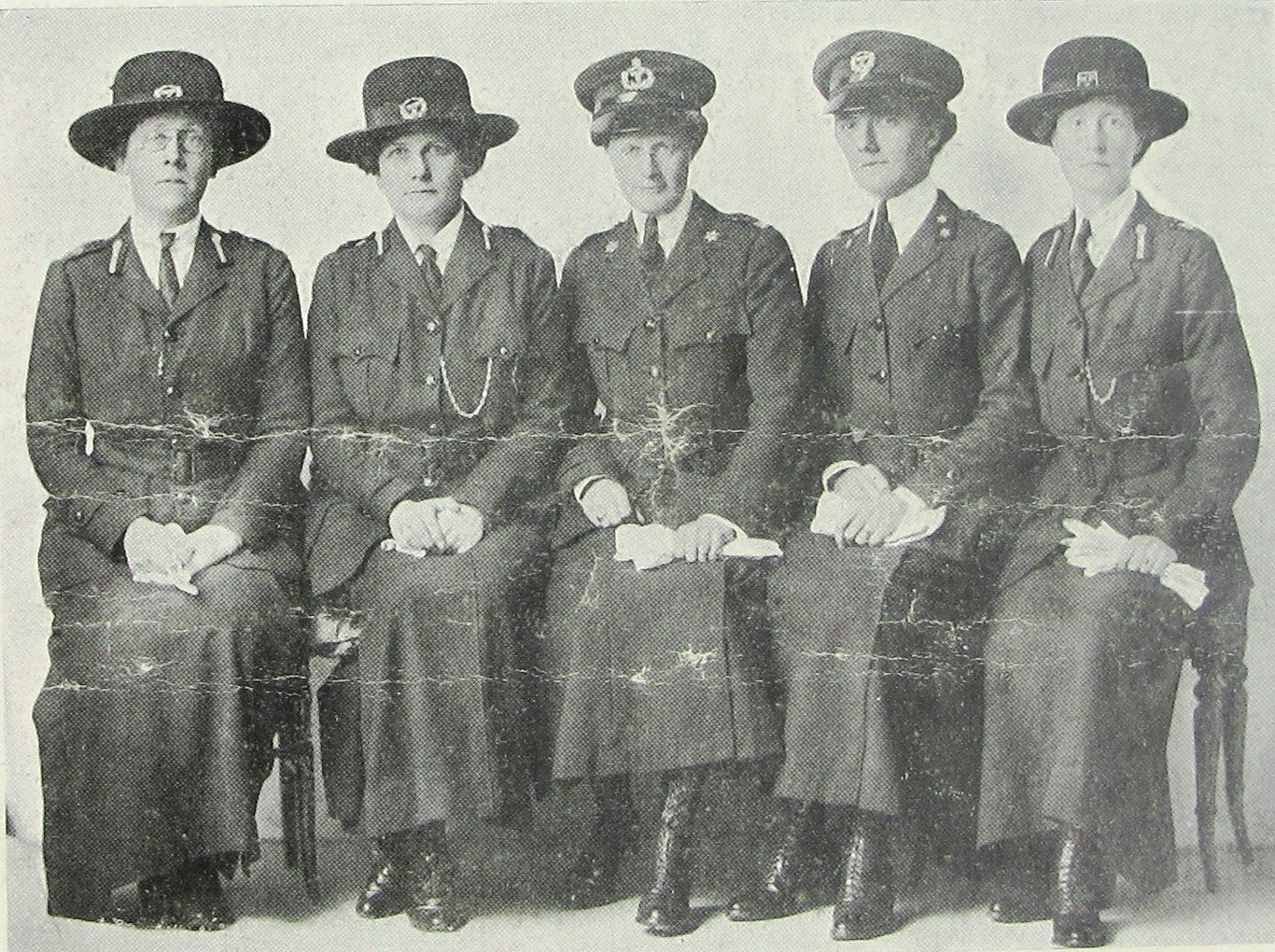
Dora Meeson (far left) as Chief Inspector in Women's Police Service circa 1916

== Exhibitions ==
- 1992 Heide Museum of Modern Art – Completing the Picture
- 2013 Castlemaine Art Gallery – 'Shimmering Light' - Dora Meeson and the Thames

== Collections ==
- Art Gallery of Ballarat
- Art Gallery of New South Wales
- Australian War Memorial
- Benalla Art Gallery
- Castlemaine Art Museum
- Christchurch Art Gallery New Zealand
- Art Gallery of New South Wales
- Imperial War Museum London
- Museum of London Docklands
- National Army Museum Chelsea
- National Gallery of Australia
- National Gallery of Victoria
- National Library of Australia
- Parliament House Art Collection
- Port of London Authority
- State Library of Tasmania

== Recognition and legacy ==
A representation of her banner was used on the design of the Australian 2003 dollar coin celebrating the centenary of women's suffrage.

Meeson Street in the Canberra suburb of Chisholm is named in her honour.

== Selected works by Dora Meeson ==
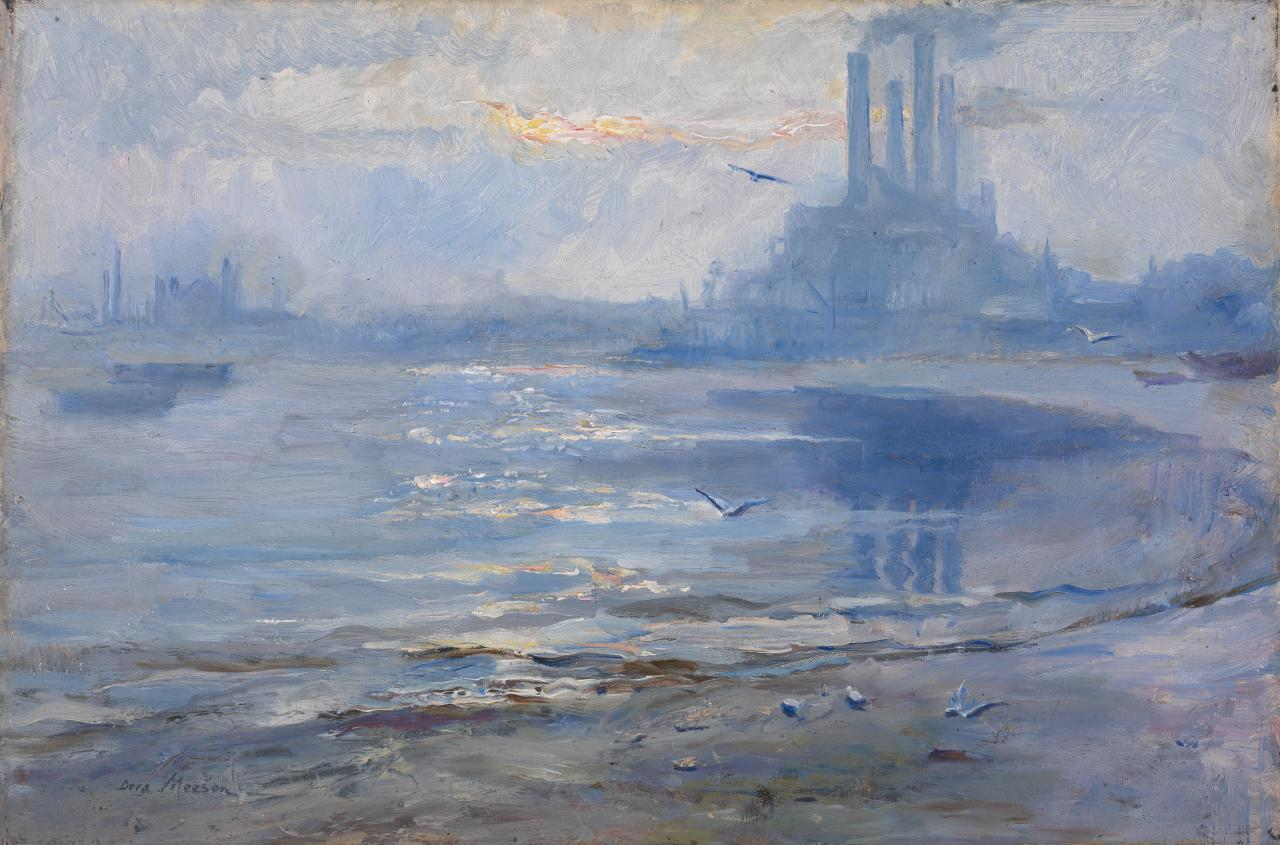
Dora Meeson (c. 1910) A foggy afternoon, Chelsea Reach

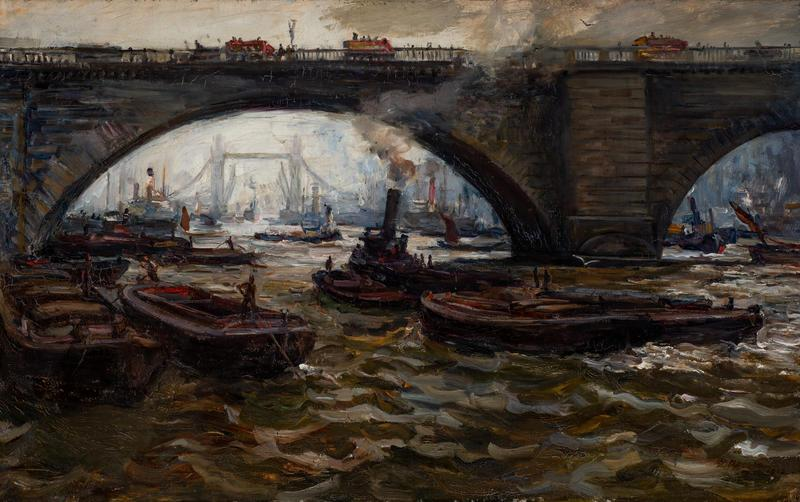
Dora Meeson (1912) London Bridge

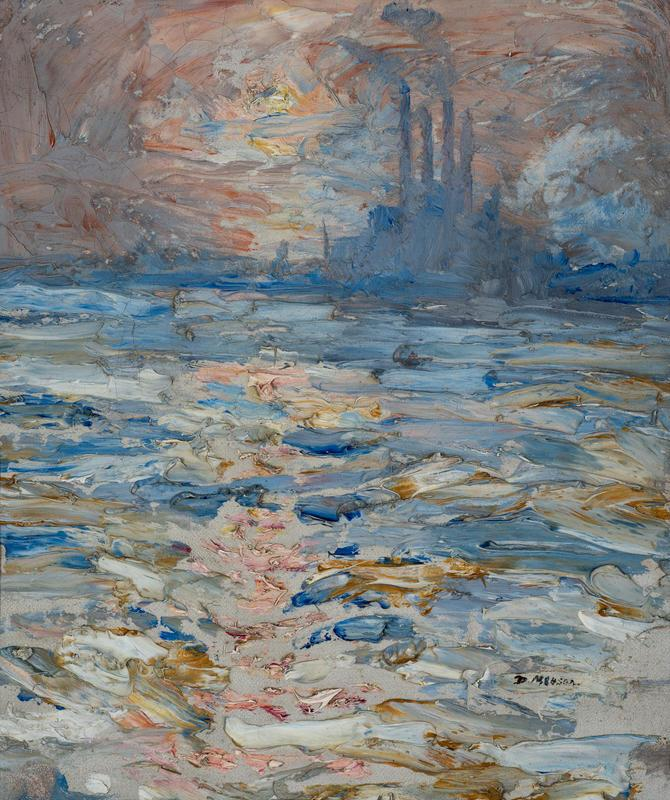
Dora Meeson (1913) Sunset at Chelsea

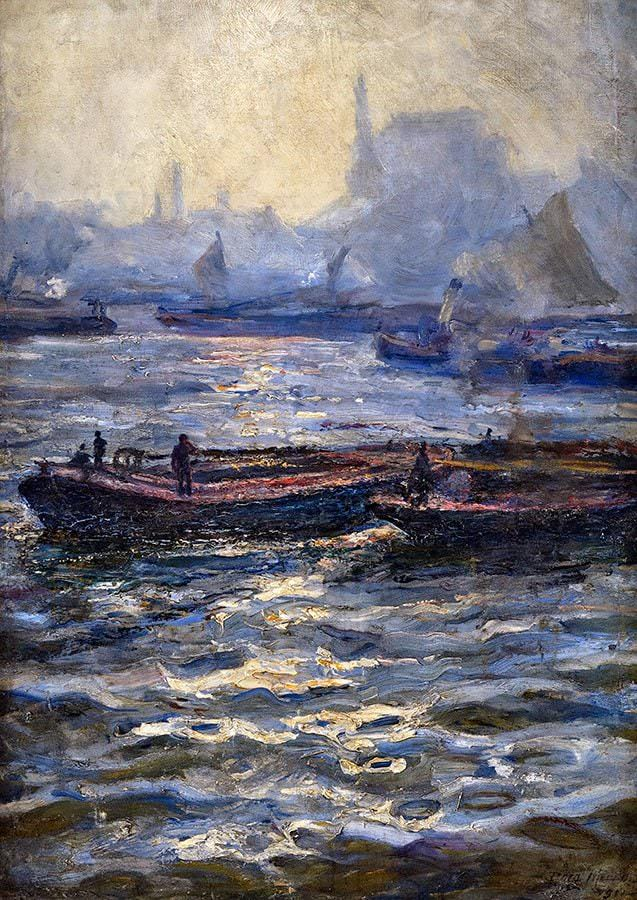
Dora Meeson (1915) The Thames at Chelsea

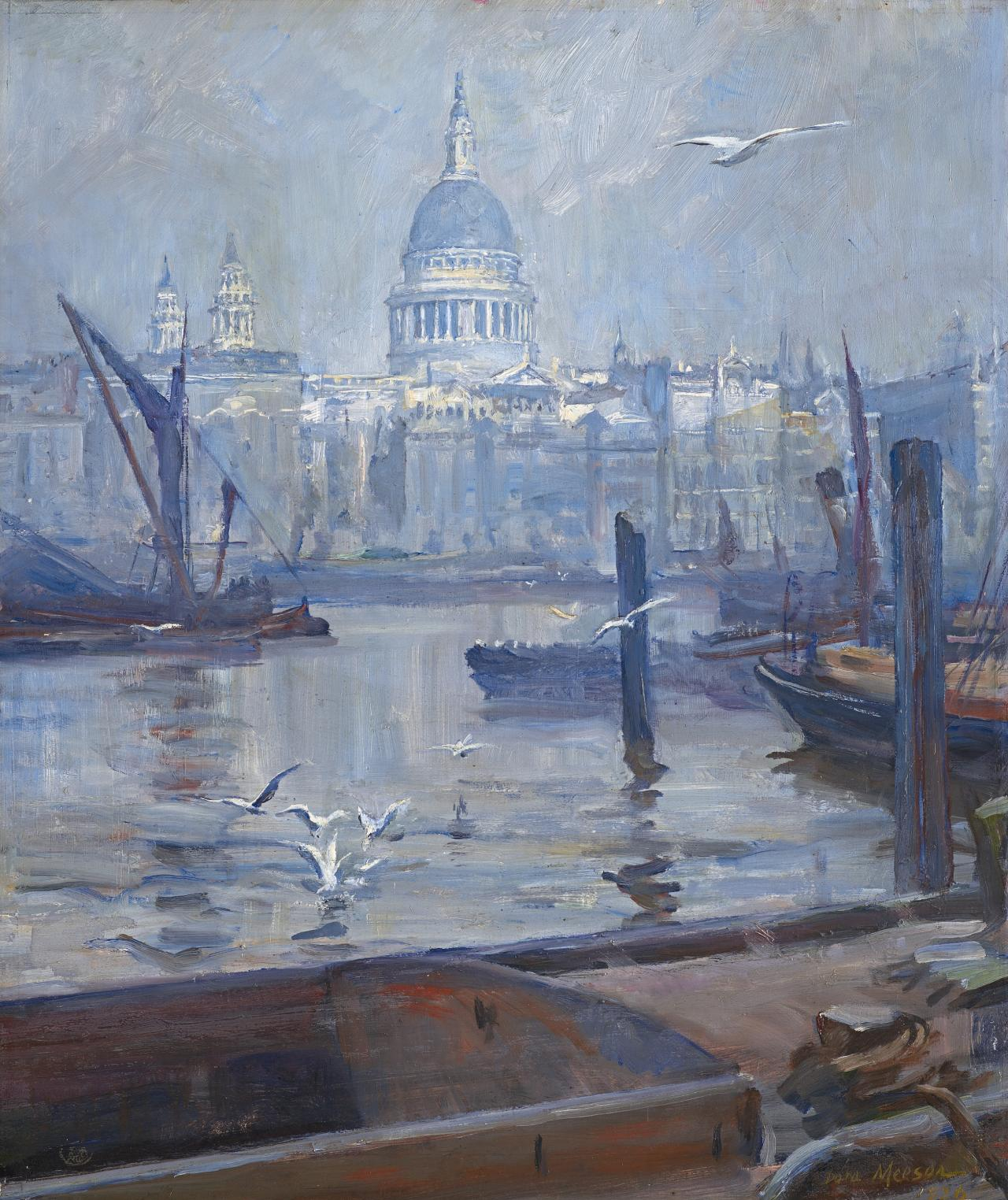
Dora Meeson (1920) Venice in London

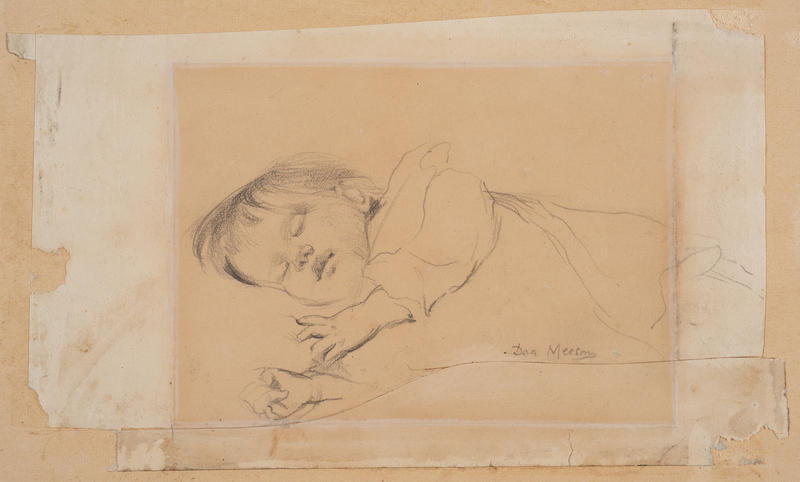
Dora Meeson (c.1920) Child Sleeping

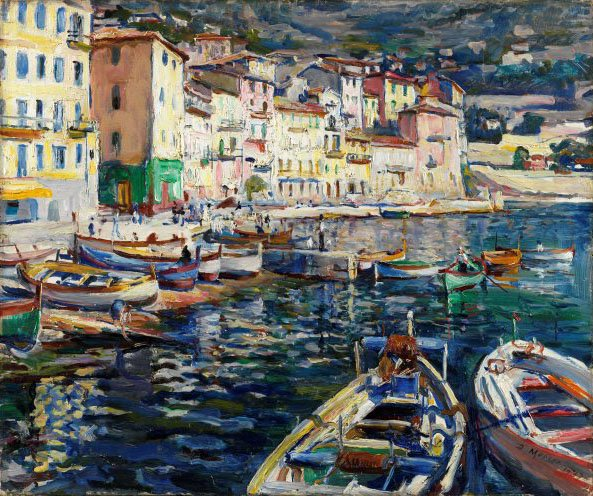
Dora Meeson (1927) Ville Franche-Sur-Mer

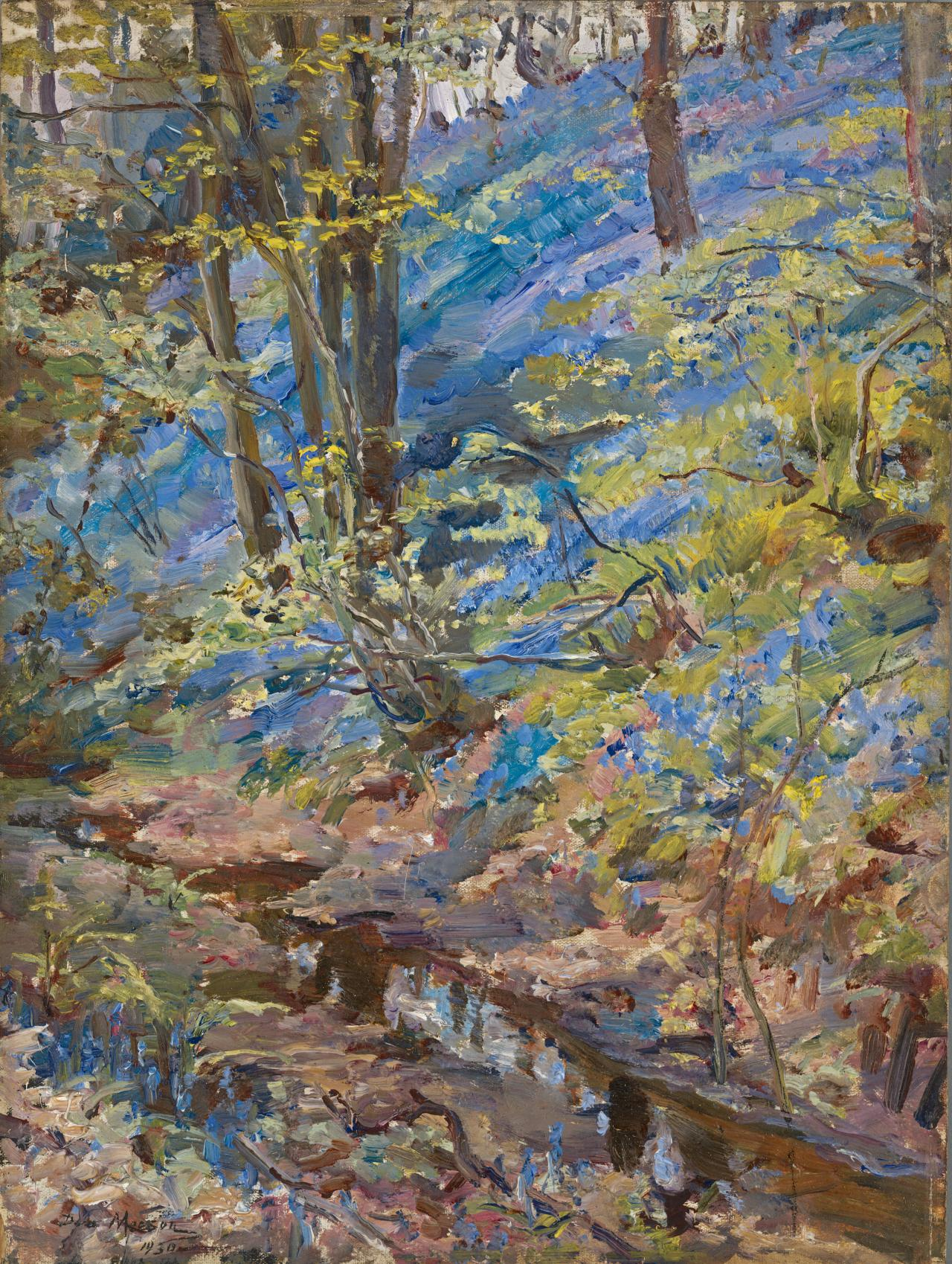
Dora Meeson (1930) Hillside
