= Clara Billing =

British artist

- Born: 1881; Blackpool, England
- Died: 1963 (aged 81–82)
- Education: Manchester School of Art; Royal College of Art
- Known for: Sculpture

Clara Ellen Billing (1881–August 1963) was a British artist known for her paintings and sculptures.

== Biography ==
Billing was born and grew up in Blackpool in the north-west of England to Emily Clare and George Billing, who went on to become a respected surgeon in Manchester. Clara Billing studied at the Manchester School of Art before undertaking further studies in London at the Royal College of Art and then in Paris. She began to produce medallions, portrait heads and genre figures and groups working in a variety of materials including cement and concrete, as well as painting portraits, landscapes and still-life compositions. Between 1913 and 1957, Billing was a regular exhibitor at the Royal Academy in London and, in the 1920s and 1930s, showed a total of eighteen works with the Society of Women Artists. In 1925 she was elected an associate member of that Society in 1925. She also participated in exhibitions organised by the Women's International Art Club, the Royal Institute of Oil Painters and the International Society of Sculptors, Painters and Gravers. Billing was a member of the Artists' Suffrage League and produced posters and cards in support of the campaign for women's voting rights.

After living in London for many years in 1925 Billing moved to Blewbury near Didcot and in 1929 married the sculptor Sydney Langford Jones. Her sister, May Billing, (1883–1939), was also an artist active in the Society of Women Artists.
