= Caroline Watts =

British illustrator

Caroline Marsh Watts
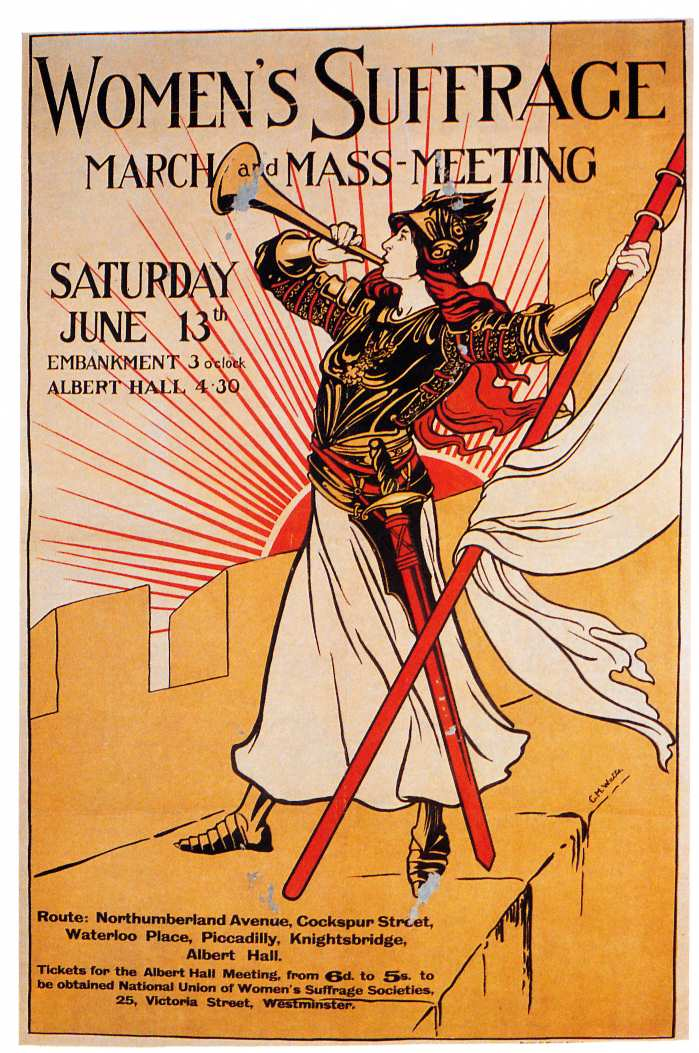
- Poster by Caroline Marsh Watts (in 1908)
- Born: 1868; Handsworth, Staffordshire, England
- Died: 1919 (aged 50–51); Colehill, England
- Occupation: Painter
- Father: Robert Watts

Caroline Marsh Watts (1868–1919) was a British painter. She was born in Handsworth, now part of Birmingham, and died at Colehill in Dorset.

== Life ==
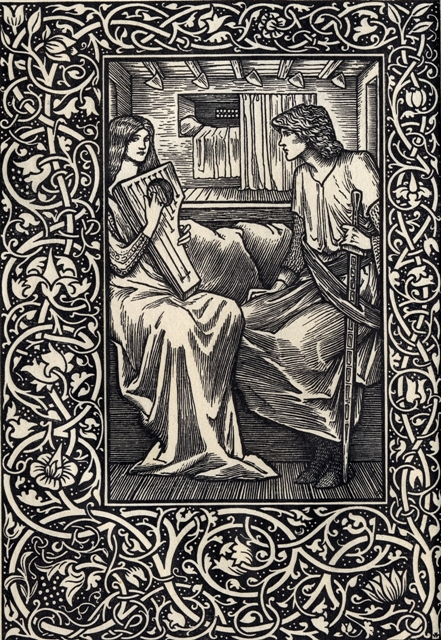
Tristan and Iseult (1902)

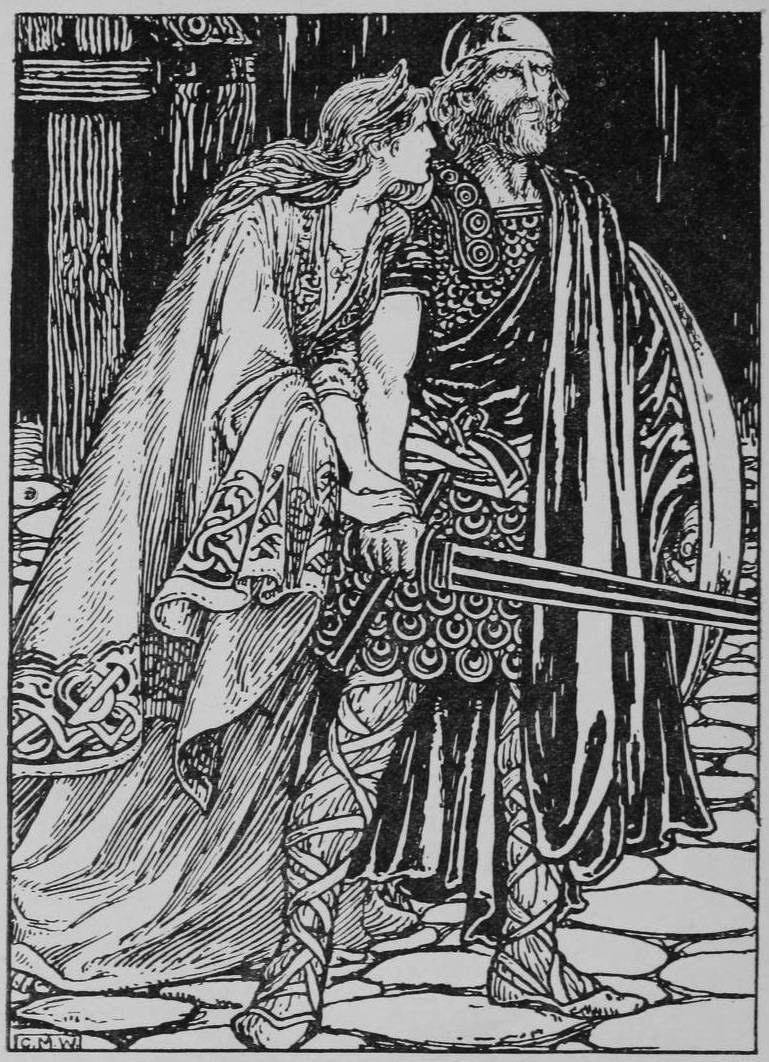
The Courtship of Ferb (1902)

Caroline Watts was the youngest child of Robert Watts. He manufactured buttons in Handsworth up to the year 1891, when he retired and moved to St Margarets in the Twickenham area with his youngest children. Caroline Watts studied at the Slade School of Fine Art in London. Upon their father's death in 1894, Watts and her sister Mary moved to Pimlico. In the 1901 census, the sisters stated Mary's occupation was compiler of indexes, while Caroline worked as a painter.

The first illustrations that can be traced back to her were drawn from 1899 on. Some depict the King Arthur legend, while others were drawn for various historical novels written by Jessie Weston and published by Alfred Nutt. Upon Nutt's death, his wife M. L. Nutt, an involved women's rights activist, took over the publishing house. Under her watch, various suffragette works were published. It is therefore assumed that she put Watts in touch with the women's right activists.

In 1908, Watts created the Artists' Suffrage League's promotional poster Bugler Girl for the National Union of Women's Suffrage Societies' June demonstrations. The motif was thereafter made the logo of the suffragette newspaper and was copied frequently. It was also borrowed by the Women's suffrage in the United States movement and recoloured in purple, white and green.

Watts and her sister lived in Godalming in 1911 and had moved to Colehill, Dorset by 1918.

== Selection of book illustrations ==
- Gottfried von Straßburg: The Story of Tristan and Iseult. Translated from the German by Jessie L. Weston. Illustrations by Caroline Watts. 1899
- Guingamor, Launfal, Tyolet, The were-wolf. Translated from the French by Jessie Laidley Weston. Illustrations by Caroline Watts. Nutt, London. 1900
- Marie de France: Seven of her Lays. Translated from the French by Edith Rickert. Illustrations by Caroline Watts. Nutt, London. 1901
- Arthur Herbert Leahy (Publisher): The Courtship of Ferb : an old Irish romance; transcribed in the twelfth century into the Book of Leinster. Illustrations by Caroline Watts. Nutt, London. 1902
- Sir Cleges; Sir Libeaus Desconus: two old English metrical romances. Prose by Jessie L. Weston. Illustrations by Caroline Watts. Nutt, London. 1902
- Samuel Taylor Coleridge: Christabel. Illustrations by Caroline Watts. J.M. Dent, London. 1904
- Sir Gawain at the Grail Castle. Translated from the French by Jessie L. Weston. Illustrations by Caroline Watts. 1904
- Katharine Tynan: The wild harp: a selection from Irish poetry. Illustrations by Caroline Watts. London. 1913
