= Artists' Suffrage League =

The Artists' Suffrage League (ASL) (1907 – c.1918) was a suffrage society formed to change parliamentary opinion and engage in public demonstrations and other propaganda activities.

== Activities ==
The ASL was established in Jan 1907 to assist with the preparations for the Mud March organised by the National Union of Women's Suffrage Societies in February 1907. Mary Lowndes was a founder member in 1907 and its chairman in 1913. Other than the central committee of chair, vice-chair and treasurer, the organisation had no traditional formal structure or statement of aims. Lowndes' home, the Brittany Studios at 259 King's Road in Chelsea was used as the studio for the group of professional women artists who formed the ASL. The ASL produced posters and postcards and designed and produced around 80 embroidered banners for the Mud March in 1908. In 1913 the ASL was supplying posters to women's suffrage groups in America. Lowndes and the league moved to 27 Trafalgar Square in Chelsea in 1917.

The body was responsible for the creation of a large number of posters, Christmas cards, postcards and banners designed by artists who included the chair Mary Lowndes, Emily Ford, Barbara Forbes, May H Barker, Clara Billing, Dora Meeson Coates, Violet Garrard, Bertha Newcombe, C Hedley Charlton and Emily J. Harding. The ASL was responsible for the decoration of the Queens Hall for the celebrations in 1918 that had been organised by the NUWSS.

== Art works ==
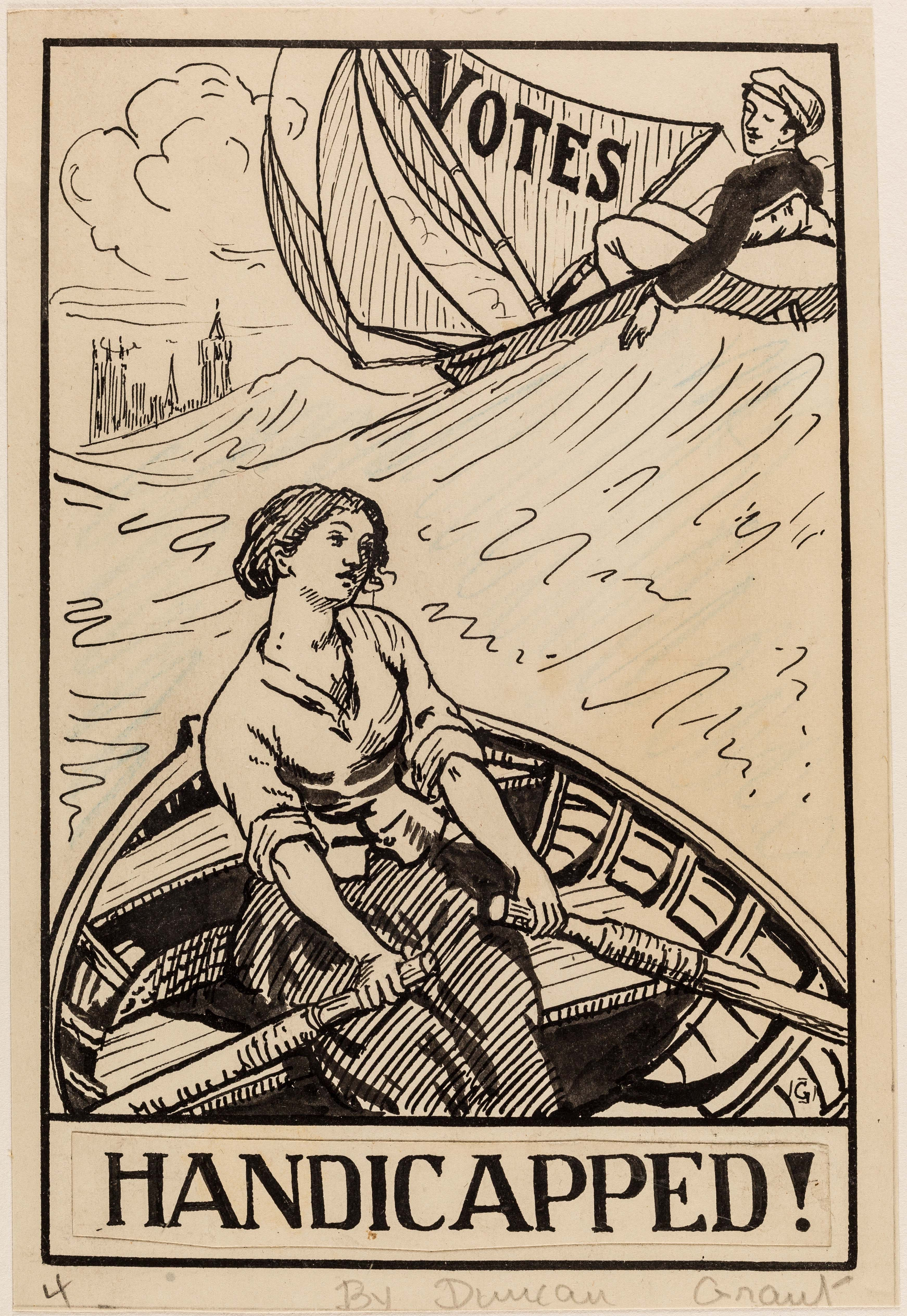
"Handicapped" by ASL's Duncan Grant

The artist Duncan Grant, whose aunt, Lady Strachey was a member of the National Union of Women's Suffrage Societies, entered the ASL poster and postcard competition in 1907. Although not a prize winner, he was encouraged to enter the ASL’s 1909 competition for a poster that was "suitable for use at elections". ASL member Barbara Forbes suggested "a man in a sailing boat (the sail represents the Vote). A woman with only oars - out in the sea of Labour". Grant was awarded the first prize, four pounds, for a poster depicting a woman heading towards the Parliament of the United Kingdom rowing a boat in heavy seas, while a man in a sailing boat effortlessly passes her on a high wave. Grant added the caption "Britons, why handicap the weaker vessel?", which was shortened to "Handicapped!" in the poster published by the ASL. It became one of the ASL's most striking posters.

== Membership ==
=== Notable members ===
- Mary Lowndes
- Dora Meeson
- Mary Sargant Florence
- Bertha Newcombe
- Caroline Watts

== Archives ==
The archives of the Artists' Suffrage League are held at The Women's Library at the London School of Economics.
