= Leon Pole =

Australian artist

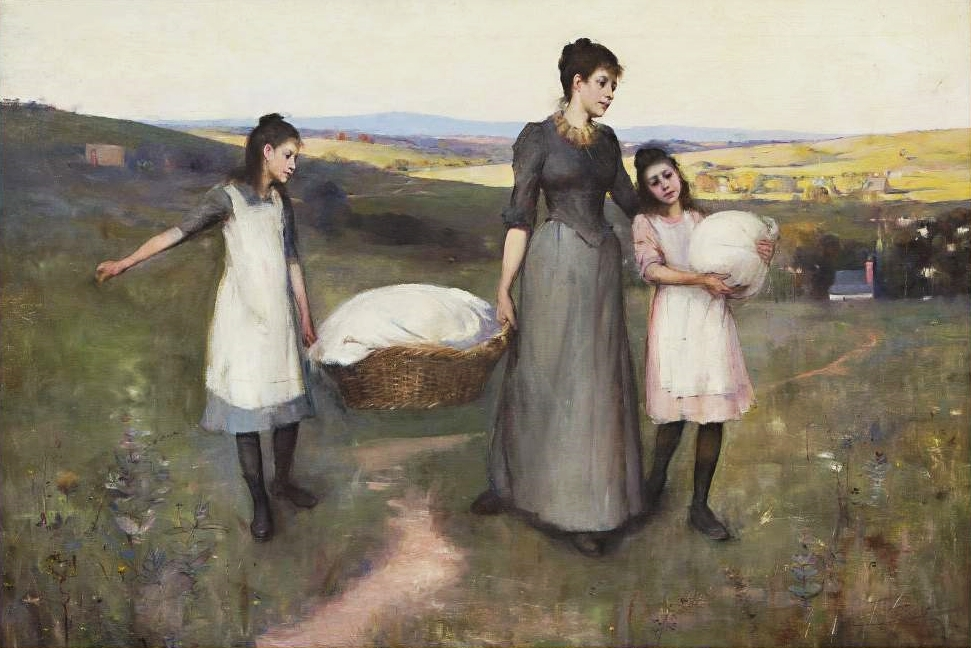
The Village Laundress, 1891, National Gallery of Victoria

Leon Pole (28 June 1871 – 31 December 1951) was an Australian artist who was associated with the Heidelberg School art movement, also known as Australian Impressionism.

Born in Adelaide, South Australia, Pole moved to Melbourne where, between 1888 and 1892, he studied under Frederick McCubbin at the National Gallery of Victoria Art School. While still a student, Pole joined Arthur Streeton, Charles Conder, Tom Roberts and other members of the Heidelberg School at their artists' camp at Eaglemont, Heidelberg. In 1890, Pole joined Heidelberg School artist Walter Withers at Charterisville, where he remained for several years.

Pole's best-known painting, The Village Laundress (1891), depicts a laundress and her two daughters walking across grassy paddocks in Templestowe with the sunlit Yarra Valley in the background, and shows the marked influence of Streeton's lyrical Heidelberg paintings, such as ′Still glides the stream, and shall for ever glide′ (1890). Reviewing The Village Laundress in 1932 for The Australasian, art critic Harold Herbert called it "a very charming and interesting picture", and said it "possesses a quality of faithful painting for the love of it, and a tenderness of colour that is very gratifying. No flashness, no blatancy, just a simple sincerity." He went on to compare its "quiet beauty" to the work of Heidelberg School artist David Davies. The painting sold at auction in 1987 for $210,000, regarded as a high price for a work by a relatively obscure Australian artist. It is now in the collection of the National Gallery of Victoria.

Pole was an acclaimed muralist, caricaturist and "lightning sketcher", and, alongside artists such as Max Meldrum and brothers Lionel and Norman Lindsay, formed part of a bohemian group in Melbourne known as the Cannibal Club. Ahead of the 1901 opening of the first Parliament of Australia at Melbourne's Royal Exhibition Building, Pole, in collaboration with three other artists, painted largescale murals of allegorical maidens throughout the venue, which remain to this day.

== Gallery ==
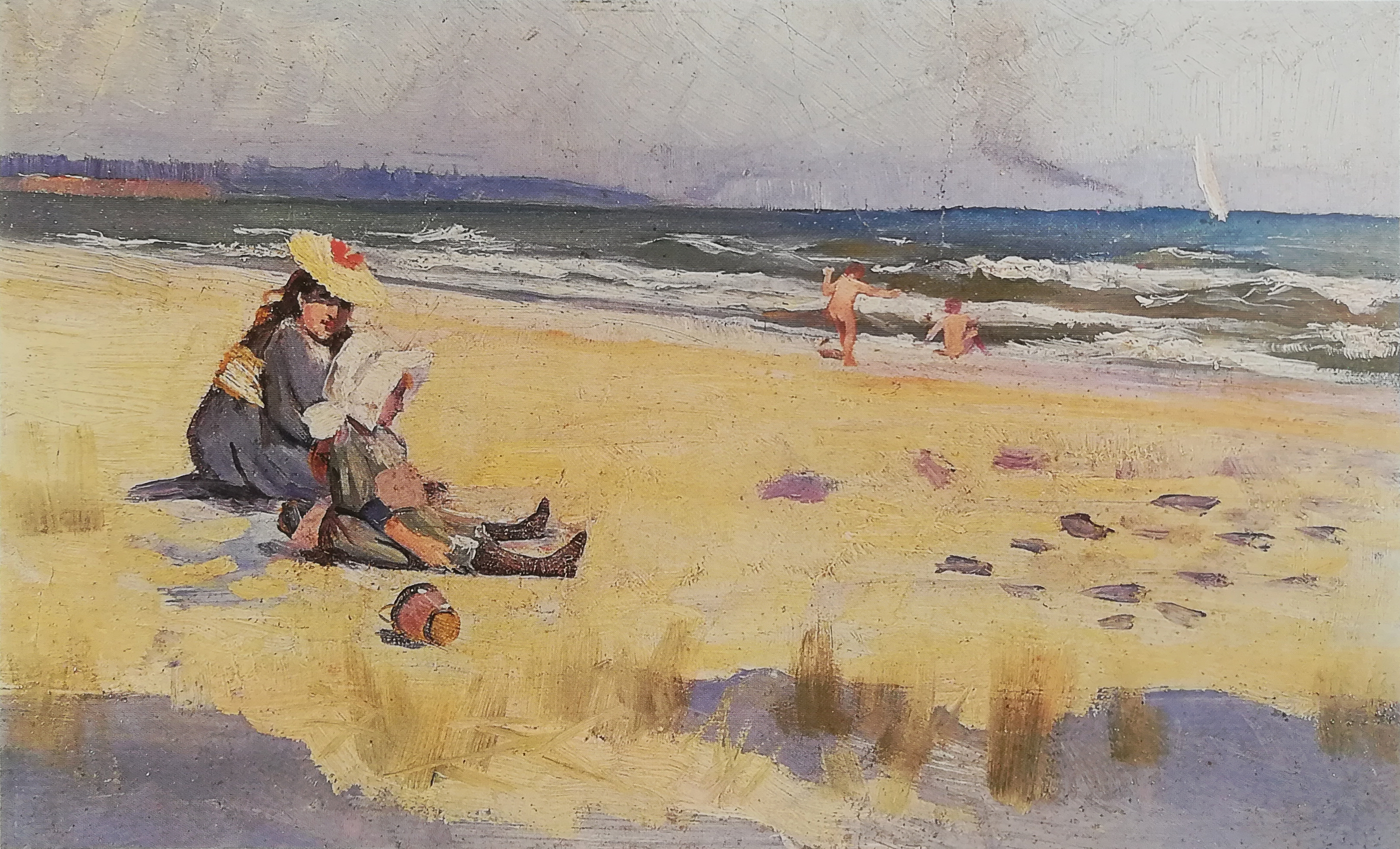
Sandringham Beach, 1890, private collection

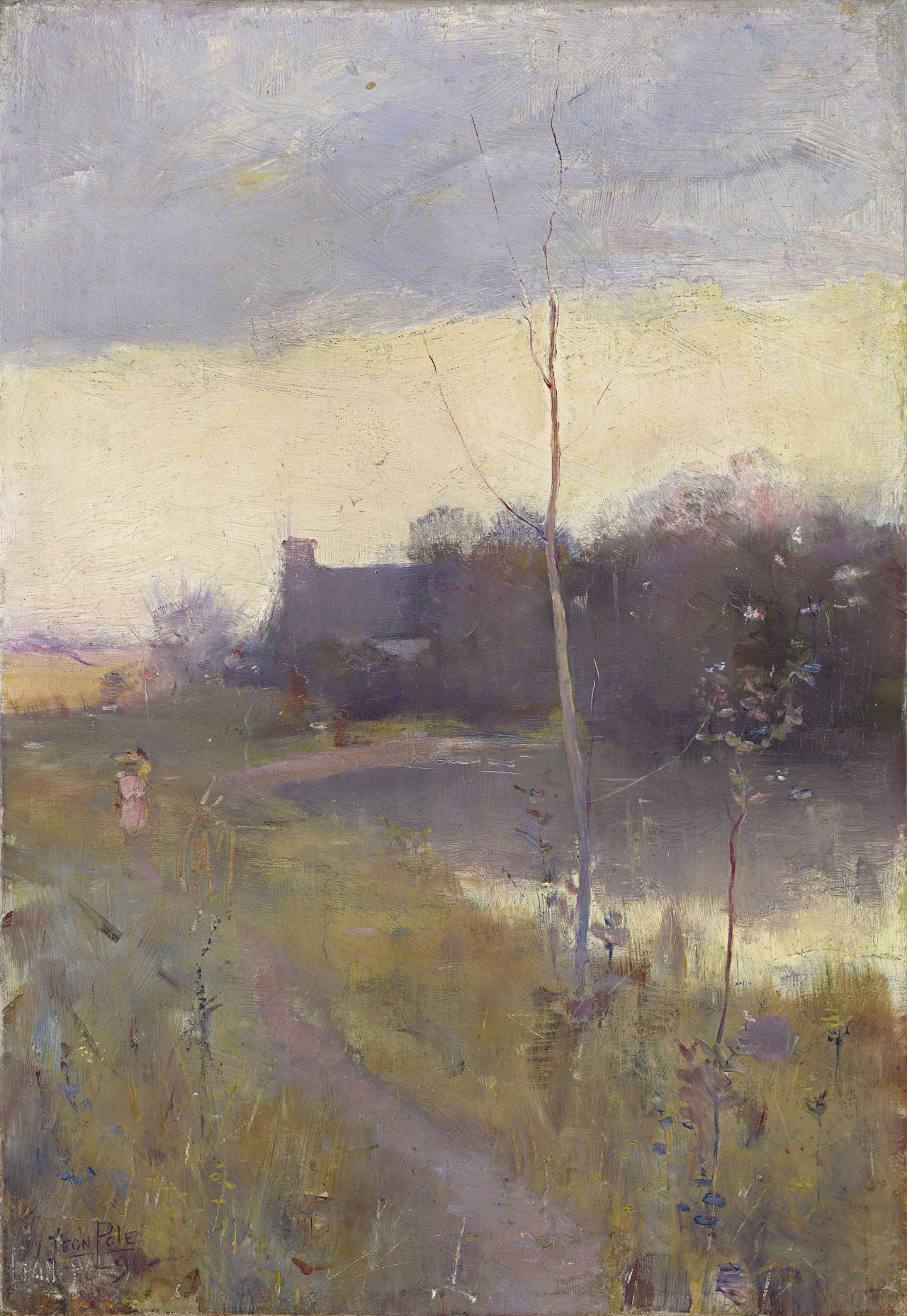
Ivanhoe, 1891, National Gallery of Victoria
