= Emily J. Harding =

British artist, illustrator, and suffragette

- Born: 1850; Bristol, England
- Died: 1940 (aged 89–90); Sutherland Shire, Australia
- Other name: Emily Jane Harding Andrews
- Education: Bristol School of Art
- Occupations: Artist, illustrator, suffragette
- Known for: Illustration
- Spouse: Edward William Andrews (m. 1879; died 1915)

Emily Jane Harding Andrews (1850–1940) was a British artist, illustrator, and suffragette. She was a member of the Artists' Suffrage League.

== Early life ==
Harding was born in 1850 in Bristol, England. She studied at Clifton Ladies' College and the Bristol School of Art.

== Career ==
In her early career she specialized in miniatures. One was included at the Royal Academy exhibition in 1877. By the mid-1880s, Harding had changed her focus to illustration, often of children's books, including Hand in Hand in Children's Land (1887) by S. and E. Lecky, The Little Ladies (1890) by Helen Milman, Merry Moments (1892) by Rose E. May, and The Disagreeable Duke (1894) by Eleanor Davenport Adams. She generally used her maiden name, though exceptions exist. Her translation and illustrations for "Fairy Tales of the Slav Peasants and Herdsmen" (ISBN 1909302554) remain in print.

Harding became involved with the Artists' Suffrage League, designing posters for the cause. She co-signed a letter to the editor of The Guardian in 1908, decrying the use of physical violence against activists, alongside fellow artist and suffragist Mary Sargant Florence.

== Personal life ==
In 1879, she married fellow artist Edward William Andrews. Harding's husband died in 1915, and she eventually emigrated to Australia. She died in 1940 in Sutherland Shire.

== Gallery ==
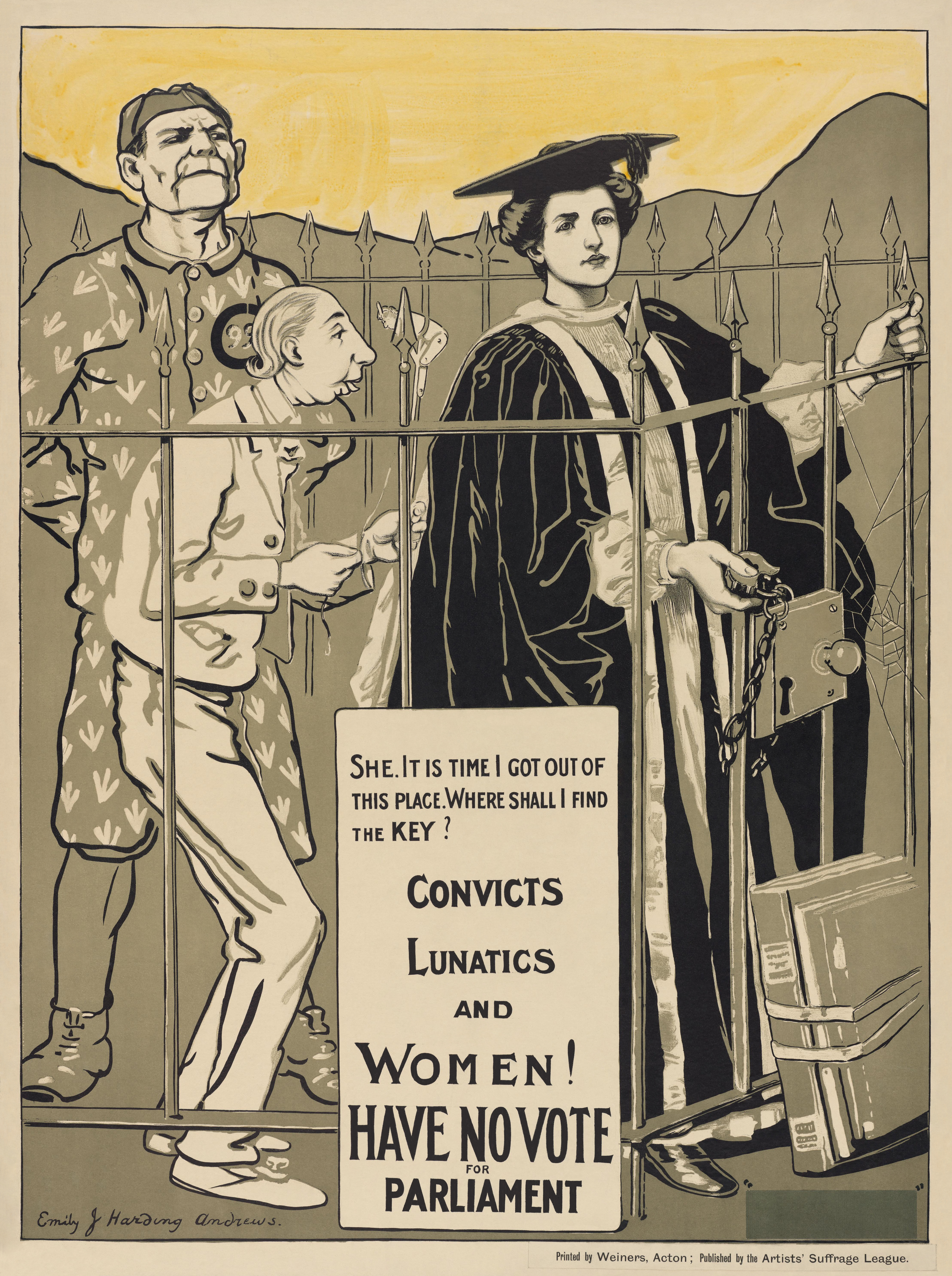
"Convicts Lunatics and Women! Have No Vote for Parliament" - Pro-suffrage poster by Harding, c. 1907-18

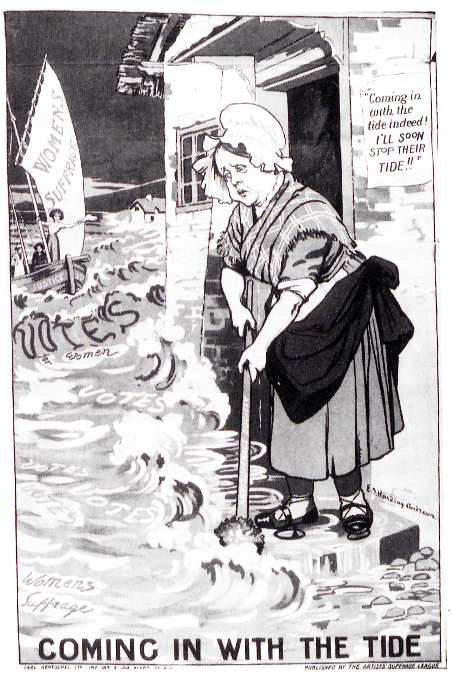
Mrs Partington

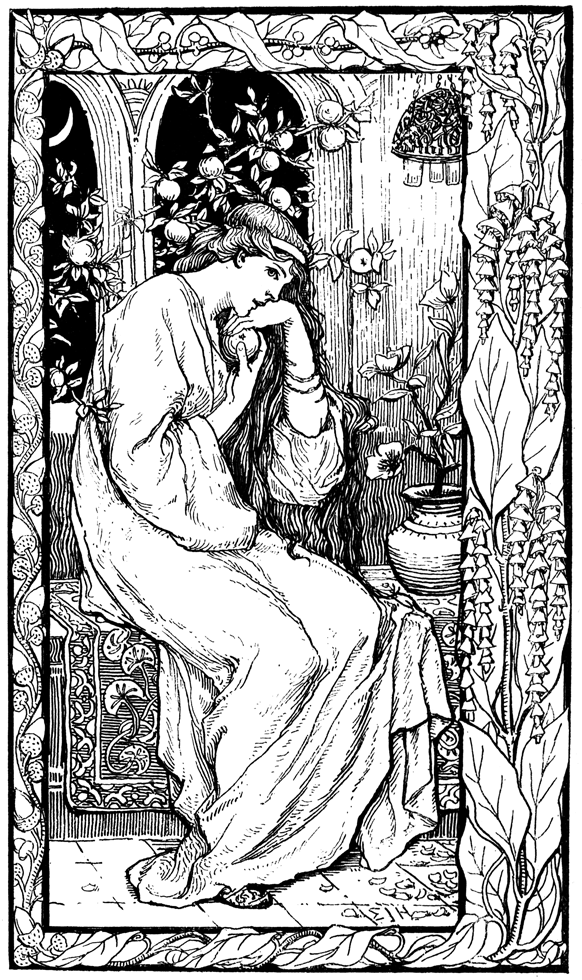
Frontispiece from "Slav Tales"
