= George Benson (disambiguation) =

George Benson (born 1943) is an American jazz musician, singer and composer.

George Benson may also refer to:

== Academics and writers ==
- George Benson (dean) (1613–1692), English dean of Hereford Cathedral
- George Benson (theologian) (1699–1762), English Presbyterian minister and author
- George Benson (Quaker) (1808–1879), American abolitionist and writer for The Liberator
- George Benson (architect) (1856–1935), English historical and architectural writer
- George Courtney Benson (1886–1960), Australian war artist and newspaper columnist
- George S. Benson (1898–1991), American missionary, author and president of Harding College
- George C. S. Benson (1908–1999), American academic and founder of Claremont McKenna College
- P. George Benson (born 1946), American academic and president of College of Charleston

== Performers ==
- George Benson (actor) (1911–1983), English stage, film and TV performer
- George Benson (saxophonist) (1929–2019), American jazz musician and educator

== Public officials ==
- George Benson (British Army officer) (1750–1814), general and governor during American Revolution
- George Benson (Maryland politician) (1876–1953), American member of Maryland House of Delegates
- George Benson (British politician) (1889–1973), English MP for Chesterfield
- George Benson (Washington politician) (1919–2004), American member of Seattle City Council

== Sportsmen ==
- George Benson (footballer) (1893–1974), English left winger
- George Benson (American football) (1919–2001), halfback for AAFC Brooklyn Dodgers

== See also ==
- George Benson Hall (1780–1821), British naval officer and Canadian politician
- George Benson Hall Jr. (1810–1876), Canadian lumber and sawmill businessman, son of above
