= Australian official war artists =

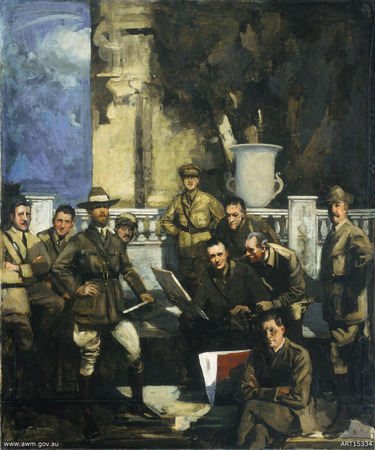
Australian official war artists, 1916–1918 by George Coates, 1920. Oil on canvas, 124.2 x 104.5 cm. The group portrait presents, left to right: front — George Bell; standing — John Longstaff, Charles Bryant, George Washington Lambert, A. Henry Fullwood, James Quinn, H. Septimus Power, Arthur Streeton; and seated back — Will Dyson, Fred Leist.

Australian official war artists are those who have been expressly employed by either the Australian War Memorial (AWM) or the Army Military History Section (or its antecedents). These artist soldiers depicted some aspect of war through art; this might be a pictorial record or it might commemorate how war shapes lives.

War artists have explored a visual and sensory dimension of war which is often absent in written histories or other accounts of warfare. Official war artists have been appointed by governments for information or propaganda purposes and to record events on the battlefield; but there are many other types of war artist.

A war artist creates a visual account of war by showing its impact as men and women are shown waiting, preparing, fighting, suffering, celebrating, The works produced by war artists illustrate and record many aspects of war, and the individual's experience of war, whether allied or enemy, service or civilian, military or political, social or cultural. The rôle of the artist and his work embraces the causes, course and consequences of conflict and it has an essentially educational purpose. For example, C.E.W. Bean's Anzac Book influenced the artists who grew up between the two world wars; and the war art of their childhoods provided a precedent and format for them to follow as war artists of the Second World War.

The AWM have appointed war artists to record the activities of Australian forces in Korea, Vietnam, East Timor and Afghanistan; and both the AWM and the Australian Army have appointed official war artists to depict Australian forces in Iraq.

== First World War ==
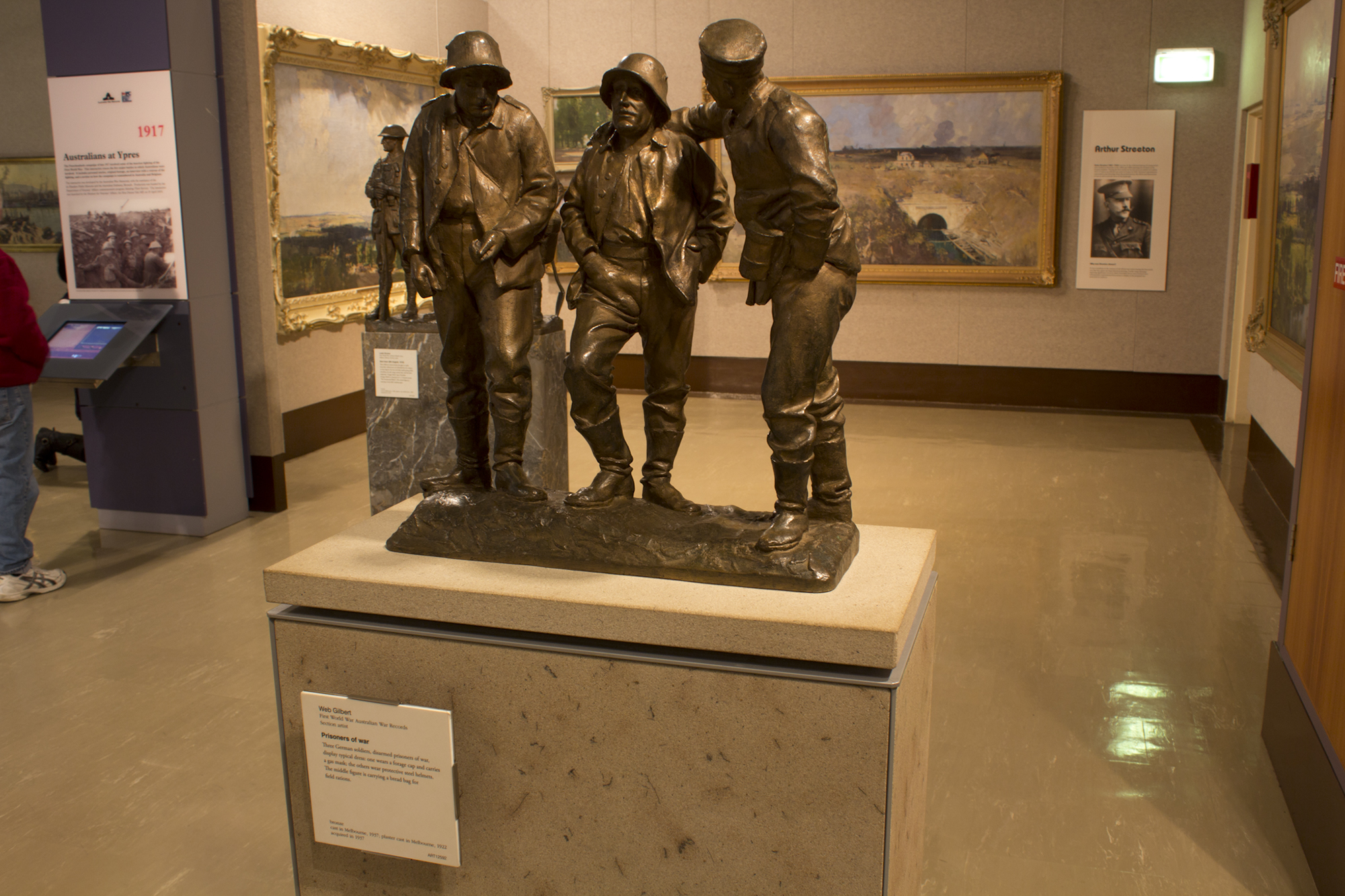
Artworks by Arthur Streeton and sculptures by Web Gilbert on display at the Australian War Memorial in 2012

The Australian tradition of war artists started during First World War, with the collection by Charles Bean of contributions by soldiers at Gallipoli to what became The Anzac Book, published in May 1916.

Will Dyson, an expatriate Australian artist living in London, petitioned the Australian government to allow him to travel to the Western Front where Australian forces were fighting. In 1917 he was finally granted permission to accompany the Australian Imperial Force to record the activities of its soldiers and thus became the first Australian official war artist.

The Australian War Records Section was created in 1917, largely as a result of lobbying by Bean, to implement the Commonwealth's war art scheme, and ten expatriate volunteers already in England were nominated as "official artists". In August 1917 H. C. Smart selected two, Leist and Power, to cover the European theatre. Their contracts ended in November, and Bryant volunteered to work there over winter. Lambert left for Egypt on Christmas Day 1917. This scheme was expanded by appointing artists who were already in uniform, designated "AIF artists".

=== Official war artists ===
Artists commissioned as members of the AIF to work officially as artists for Australia with troops in the field, specially appointed to visit the front for periods ranging from three months upwards:

France

- LT. Will Dyson — Was constantly with the troops from Somme, winter 1916 till end of war; his were mostly figure subjects in black and white.
- LT. Fred Leist — Saw third Battle of Ypres and winter, 1917. His subjects were figures and landscape.
- LT. H. Septimus Power — Third Battle of Ypres and winter, 1917; mainly with the artillery; horses, figures and landscape.
- LT. Arthur Streeton — Last campaign on Somme; country subjects, landscape, Battle of Hamel, &c.
- LT. Charles Bryant — Winter of 1917 at Messines; landscape, sea transports at Boulogne, &c.
- LT. James Quinn — Last campaign on Somme, mainly portraits.
- LT. A. Henry Fullwood — Last campaign on Somme and Villers-Bretonneux; mainly landscapes.
- LT. John Longstaff — Last campaign on Somme; mainly portraits.
- LT. George Bell — The occupation of Germany, &c.

Palestine and Gallipoli.

- CAPT George Lambert — In Palestine with Light Horse, 1917-18; visited Gallipoli after armistice, with Charles Bean; figures, landscapes, portraits.

=== A.I.F. artists ===
Mainly younger artists who had enlisted in the A.I.F., and fought through with the troops, later being detailed specially for the work upon pictures for war records:

Egypt and France.

- CAPT. Will Longstaff — Egypt and France; horses, desert landscape, aeroplanes
- LT. George Benson — From landing to end of war; all subjects
- LT. Frank R. Crozier — From Lone Pine to end of war; all subjects

France.

- LT. James F. Scott — Wounded in third Battle of Ypres; served till end of war; all subjects
- LT. Louis McCubbin — Winter of 1917 to end of war; landscapes
- LT. Daryl Lindsay — Winter of 1916 to end of war; general subjects and medical drawings
- SSGT James MacDonald — Working as an A.I.F. artist at the time of the Battle of Hamel

=== Sculptors ===
- LT. Web Gilbert — not a serving soldier, but was in France for a considerable time at the end of 1918, later worked on models and a memorial statue
- LT. W. Leslie Bowles — Australian-born sculptor, served with British forces, including Tank Corps. Recruited to work on Australian War Memorial
- LT. Wallace Anderson — fought with First AIF, then attached to Australian War Records Section, London, in 1918

All three worked on dioramas for which Louis McCubbin painted the backdrops.

Special work was also done for A.I.F. publications by David Barker (Gallipoli and Palestine), Leyshon White (Gallipoli and France), and others.

== Second World War ==
During the Second World War, the Australian War Memorial, continued the scheme and appointed war artists whilst the Australian Army, Royal Australian Navy and Royal Australian Air Force appointed their own official war artists from within their ranks. Other venues have honored Australian participation in the war.

== Selected artists ==
The practice of artists being members of the military services broadly ended after the Korean War. Those artists who as members of the military were tasked to produce artistic works, while being official war artists are also Veteran Artists, as is any current or former member of the military who engages in the arts.

=== First World War ===
- George Bell, 1878–1966.
- George Courtney Benson, 1886–1960.
- Frederick C. Britton, 1889–1931
- Charles Bryant, 1883–1937.
- George Coates
- Frank R. Crozier, 1883–1948.
- Will Dyson, 1880–1938.
- A. Henry Fullwood, 1863–1930.
- Charles Web Gilbert, 1867–1925.
- John C. Goodchild 1898–1980
- George Washington Lambert, 1873–1930.

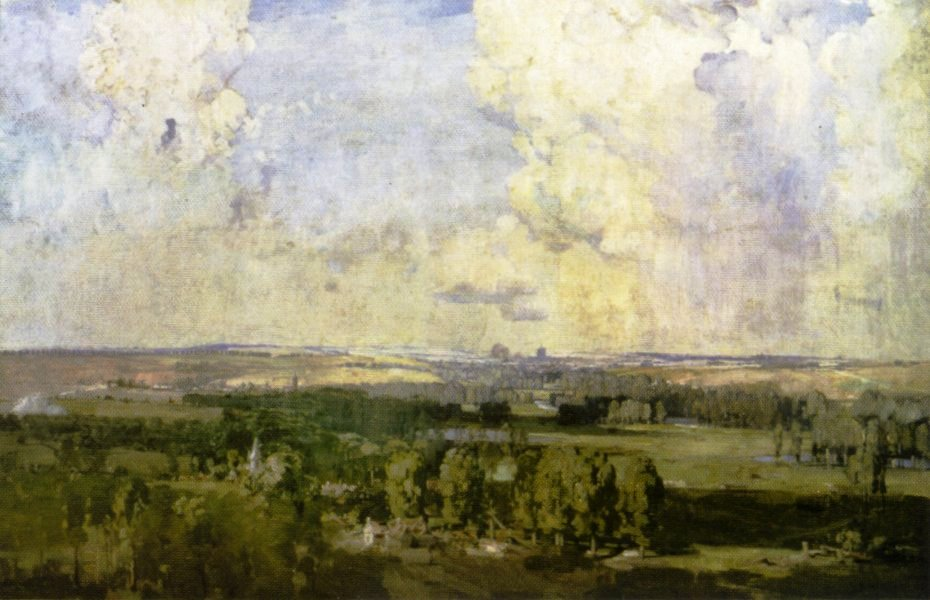
Arthur Streeton: Amiens, the key of the west, oil-on-canvas, completed in 1919.

- Fred Leist, 1878–1945.
- Daryl Lindsay
- John Longstaff, 1862–1941.
- Will Longstaff, 1879–1953.
- Louis Frederick McCubbin, 1890–1952.
- W. B. McInnes
- H. Septimus Power, 1877–1951.
- James Quinn, 1869–1951.
- James F. Scott 1877–1932.
- Arthur Streeton, 1867–1943.
- Charles Wheeler

=== Second World War ===
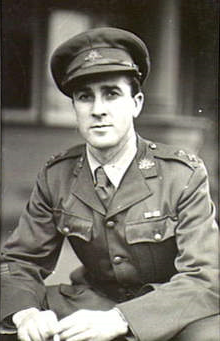
Lieutenant Frank Hodgkinson

- Harold Abbott, 1906–1986.
- Dennis Adams, 1914–2001.
- Richard Ashton, 1913–2001.
- George Allen, 1900–1972.
- Yosl Bergner, 1920–2017 .
- Stella Bowen, 1893–1947.
- Ernest Buckmaster, 1897–1968.
- Colin Colahan, 1897–1987.
- Sybil Mary Frances Craig, 1901–1989
- William Dargie, 1912–2003.
- William Dobell, 1899–1970.
- Russell Drysdale, 1912–1981.
- Ray Ewers, 1917–1998.
- Harold Freedman, 1915–1999.
- Donald Friend, 1915–1989.
- John C. Goodchild, 1898–1980.
- Murray Griffin, 1903–1992.
- Henry Hanke, 1901–1989.
- Ivor Hele, 1912–1993.
- Sali Herman, 1898–1993.
- Nora Heysen, 1911–2003.
- Frank Hinder, 1906–1992.
- Ludwig Hirschfeld Mack, 1895–1965.
- Frank Hodgkinson AM, 1919–2001.
- Rex Julius, 1914–1944
- Geoffrey Mainwaring 1912–2000
- Herbert McClintock, 1906–1985.
- Arthur Murch, 1902–1989.
- Alan Moore, 1914–2015
- Thomas Maxwell Newton, 1919–1975.
- Sidney Nolan, 1917–1992.
- Frank Norton, 1916–1983.
- Tony Rafty, 1915–2015 .
- Reginald Wilfred (Bill) Rowed 1916–1990
- Grace Cossington Smith, 1892–1984.
- Grace Taylor, 1897–1988.
- Ralph Walker, 1912–2003.

=== Recent conflicts ===
- Rick Amor, 1948– , Peacekeeping in East Timor.
- Jon Cattapan, 1956– , Peacekeeping in East Timor.
- Peter Churcher, 1964– , war on terrorism.
- George Gittoes AM, 1949– .
- Shaun Gladwell, 1972– , War in Afghanistan.
- Bruce Fletcher, 1937– , Vietnam War
- Ivor Hele, 1912–1993, Korean War
- eX de Medici, 1959– , Regional Assistance Mission to Solomon Islands
- Ken McFadyen, 1939–1997, Vietnam War
- Lewis Miller, 1959– , War in Iraq.
- Frank Norton, 1916–1983, Korean War
- Wendy Sharpe, 1960– , Peacekeeping in East Timor
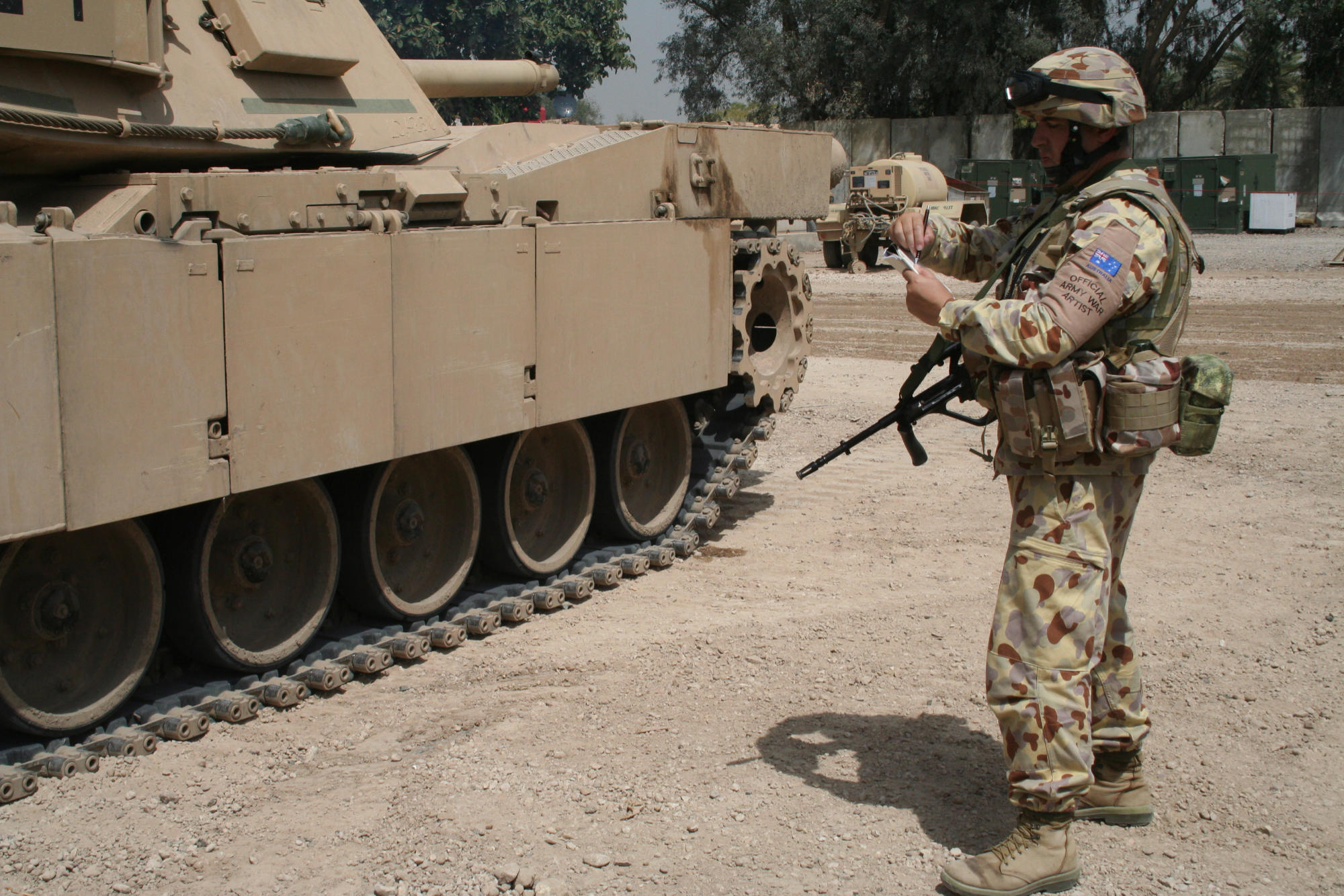
- Captain Conway Bown, Australian Army Official War Artist, Iraq, 2006
  Conway Bown, 1966– , Australian Army War Artist, RAAF War artist, War in Iraq and War in Afghanistan and war on terrorism.

== See also ==
- War artists
- Military art
- War photography
- American official war artists
- British official war artists
- New Zealand official war artists
