= James Peter Quinn =

Australian portrait painter (1871–1951)

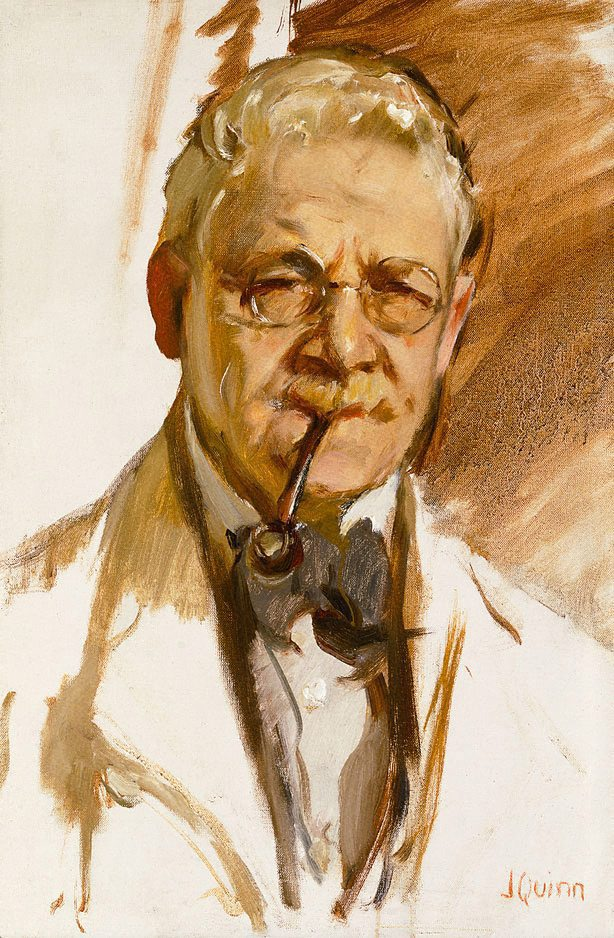
- James Quinn (1939) Self portrait. AGNSW
- Born: December 4, 1871
- Died: February 18, 1951 (aged 79); Prahran
- Resting place: St Kilda, Victoria
- Education: National Gallery of Victoria Art School, Académie Julian, École des Beaux-Arts
- Known for: Portraiture
- Notable work: War artist
- Movement: Realism
- Spouse: Blanche Louise Guernier
- Children: René Quinn
- Parents: John Quinn (father); Ann Long (mother)
- Elected: co-founder London Portrait Society, member Royal Society of Portrait Painters, member Royal Institute of Oil Painters

James Peter Quinn (4 December 1871 – 18 February 1951) was an Australian portrait painter born in Melbourne.

== Education ==
Quinn studied part-time under Frederick McCubbin 1887–1999, at the Melbourne's National Gallery of Victoria Art School under George Folingsby and Bernard Hall 1889–1893, then in Paris at the Académie Julian and the École des Beaux-Arts from 1893–1901 under Jean Paul Laurens aided by a National Gallery of Victoria travelling scholarship. He spent time painting at the Etaples art colony in northern France, alongside other Australians including Rupert Bunny and Hilda Rix Nicholas.

== Portrait painter ==
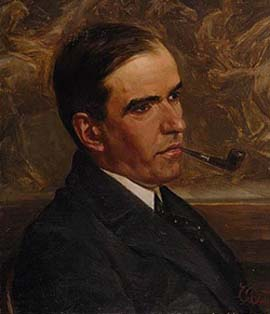
My friend Harold Parker, c. 1907. Oil on canvas on board, 35.5 x 31 cm., collection of the National Library of Australia

By 1904, Quinn was a highly successful portrait painter and exhibited at the Royal Academy of Arts. His Mère et Fils (of his wife and son), was awarded an honourable mention at the Salon, Paris, in 1912. He was commissioned to paint Joseph Chamberlain, the Duchess of York and the Duke of Windsor.

Quinn joined the second exhibition of the Australian Art Association that had formed in 1912. Held at the Melbourne Athenaeum, it was described by Argus journalist H. B. Harrison as "a sincere and very earnest endeavour to grapple with the problem of raising Australian painting from the despondency into which it has fallen," and more "widely representative of the best Art of Australia" His fellow exhibitors joining the founding group were Arthur Streeton, Penleigh Boyd, Percy Leason, Rupert Bunny, Harold Herbert, Herbert McClintock, George Coates, Clara Southern, David Davies, E. Phillips Fox, Ruth Sutherland, the American F. C. Frieske, and others.

== War Artist ==
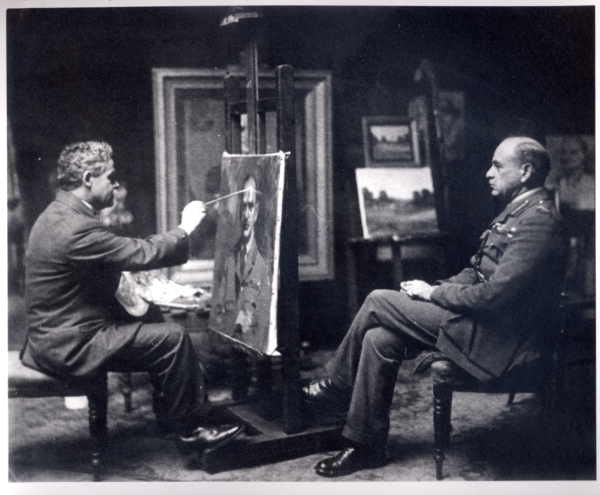
James Quinn painting John Monash

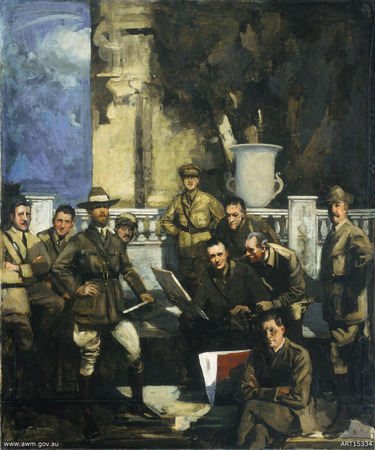
James Quinn standing fifth from the left in this group portrait of Australian official war artists, 1916-1918 by George Coates, 1920. Oil on canvas, 124.2 x 104.5 cm. The painting presents, left to right: front — George Bell; standing — John Longstaff, Charles Bryant, George Washington Lambert, A. Henry Fullwood, Quinn (leaning over Leist), H. Septimus Power, Arthur Streeton; and seated back — Will Dyson, Fred Leist.

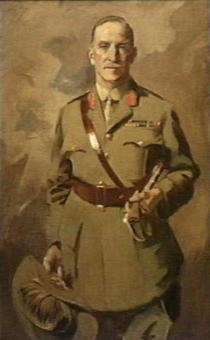
Lieutenant General Sir Henry Chauvel, 1919. Oil on canvas, 121.2 x 75.2 cm., collection of the Australian War Memorial

Quinn was accredited official war artist for the First AIF during World War I, painting prominent officers in France (causing considerable friction with authorities and fellow artists).

In 1919 in London, Quinn painted General Sir John Monash, Commander in Chief of the Australian Corps. Monash, credited as the most resourceful and innovative General of WW1, planned and carried out with his 5 Australian Divisions, and the Canadian Corps on their right flank, the significant victory at the Battle of Amiens, 8 Aug 1918, which brought about the earlier than expected end to WW1. Quinn's portrait belonged to the Monash-Bennett family mantel until being gifted to the National Portrait Gallery of Australia, Canberra. This portrait was the model for the Monash Medal awarded each year to an Outstanding Australian for her/his contribution in Leadership, Integrity, and Service to the Australian community and beyond.

Then from 1919, Quinn worked with Canadian War Records, only returning to Australia for any significant period in December 1935 after the death of son René.

== Australia ==
He rejoined the highly conservative Victorian Artists Society and was even president for a record 12 years, showed again with the Australian Art Association in 1924, and in 1937 he became a foundation member of, and exhibited with, Robert Menzies' anti-modernist organisation, the Australian Academy of Art. His openness to modern art made him no friends there, and was later the basis of a public confrontation with Prime Minister Robert Menzies. However, he continued exhibiting his paintings and taught at the National Gallery of Victoria Art School. His work was also part of the painting event in the art competition at the 1932 Summer Olympics.

== Legacy ==
A commemorative exhibition organised by art historian Alison Fraser, director of the Victorian College of the Arts, and held there in 1980, brought his portraiture out of obscurity.

== Exhibitions ==
- 1914, June: inclusion in the second annual exhibition of the Australian Art Association. Melbourne Athenaeum, Collins Street.
- 1943, from 1 December; Inclusion in a group show of ninety-one paintings and etchings with Arnold Shore, Max Meldrum, John Rowell, Allan Jordan, John Farmer, Mary Hurry, Dora Serle, Margaret Pestell, Dora Wilson, Isabel Tweddle, Aileen Dent, Murray Griffin, Geo. Colville, and Victor Cog. Hawthorn Library.

== Collections ==
- Art Gallery of New South Wales
- Art Gallery of Western Australia
- National Gallery of Victoria (12 works)
- National Library of Australia: My Friend Harold Parker, Portrait of Richard Gardiner Casey, Dr Cecil John Davenport
- Australian War Memorial, Canberra: war portraits, including Sir Harry Chauvel (1919), Lieutenant-General Sir John Monash GCMG KCB (1918), William Riddell Birdwood (Baron Birdwood)
- Castlemaine Art Museum: Portrait of Her Royal Highness The Duchess of York, (later known as the Queen Mother) (1931), Blanchette, portrait of Mrs Quinn(1920), William Hansford (n.d.), The Little Grey Lady (c.1935)
