= H. C. Smart =

Australian journalist and publicist

Henry Casimir Smart CBE (1878 – 7 July 1951) was an Australian journalist and publicist, working from Australia House in London.

== History ==
Smart was educated at Sydney High School and on leaving was employed as a journalist.

He fought in the South African wars.

Sometime before 1911 he was appointed director of the Publicity Department, Australia House, London.

In January 1916 he was contacted by C. E. W. Bean, who was having trouble securing a publisher for his magazine, The Anzac Book, an illustrated history of the Gallipoli campaign from the landing to the evacuation. By 15 February they had signed up with Cassell and Company and had a final press-ready proof in their hands. There was a problem with war-time supplies of paper, and the first copies rolled of the press in May. Bean and Smart worked closely together thereafter, discussing plans for a national gallery, war memorial, developing the Australian War Records Section, (for which Smart selected the artists (Fred Leist and H. Septimus Power were the first) and supplied their materials), and much else.

In 1921 he was appointed Deputy Director of Migration, with offices in Australia House.

He was an organiser of the Wembley Exhibition of 1924–1925, for which service he was awarded the CBE.

He directed the Australian pavilion at the 1938 Exhibition in Glasgow.

He was a supporter of Australian art, and in 1951 garnered support for an exhibition of Australian works to be held in London.

He married an English girl, Daisy Hope Foster, and settled in England. Their children included

- Hope Foster "Patsy" Smart (10 September 1918 – 6 February 1996), actress, married John Warrington in 1945
- Ralph Foster Smart (27 August 1908 – 12 February 2001), director of Bush Christmas and Bitter Springs

It is not known whether Smart ever paid a return visit to Australia. He died in a nursing home in Maidenhead, aged 72.

== Recognition ==
- Smart was awarded the CBE in 1926.
- Smart Place, in the Canberra suburb of Evatt, was named for him.

== Publications ==
- Smart, H. C. Australia in the great war; the story told in pictures 1918
- Smart, H. C. (ed.) What Australia Has Done 1944
