= Port Moresby (Bomana) War Cemetery =

British Commonwealth cemetery in Papua New Guinea

- Commonwealth War Graves Commission
- Used for those deceased 1945
- Location: 9.3958°S 147.2511°E near Port Moresby, Papua New Guinea
- Total burials: 3,824
- Unknowns: 699

Burials by nation
- Australia, India and Commonwealth of Nations

Burials by war
- World War II

Port Moresby (Bomana) Cemetery is a Commonwealth War Graves Commission cemetery dating from World War II near Port Moresby, Papua New Guinea. The cemetery contains the graves of those who died in the fighting in the former Territory of Papua and on Bougainville Island. The remains of 3,826 Commonwealth soldiers, 699 of them unidentified are buried in the cemetery; as well two others: a Dutch citizen and one burial not related to the war.

Over 600 Indian soldiers who fought in the Second World War are buried at the cemetery.

== Notable burials ==
- Artie Carnell (1909–1942), Australian rugby league footballer
- John Alexander French (1914–1942), Australian recipient of the Victoria Cross
- Rex Julius (1914–1944), Australian official war artist
- Bruce Steel Kingsbury (1918–1942), Australian recipient of the Victoria Cross
