= Frank Crozier =

Frank Crozier may refer to:

- Frank R. Crozier (1883–1948), Australian war artist
- Frank Percy Crozier (1879–1937), British military officer
