= Harold Parker (sculptor) =

British-born sculptor (1873–1962)

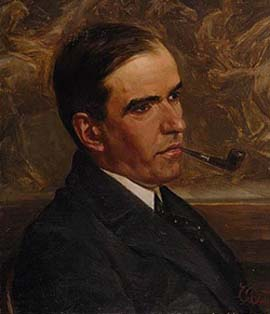
My friend Harold Parker by James Quinn, c. 1907. Oil on canvas on board, 35.5 x 31 cm., in the collection of the National Library of Australia

Harold Parker (27 August 1873 – 23 April 1962) was a British-born sculptor, raised in Queensland, Australia, and subsequently worked in the United Kingdom.

== Early life ==
Harold Parker was born in 1873 in Aylesbury, Buckinghamshire, England. His family moved to Brisbane, Australia in 1876.

== Artistic career ==
He studied at the Brisbane Technical College under John A Clarke and Godfrey Rivers, then in 1896 left for London where he studied under William Silver Frith, then worked as assistant to Thomas Brock, Hamo Thornycroft and Goscombe John.

He rented a studio near that of fellow sculptor John Tweed, and from 1903 to 1929 regularly exhibited at the Royal Academy of Arts, London, and occasionally at the Old Salon, Paris. He was commissioned to portray Queensland expatriates and became a rival of Bertram Mackennal. In 1906 he was elected a member of the Royal Society of British Sculptors. The triumph of his career came in 1908 when for £1000 the Chantrey Bequest purchased his 'Ariadne' for the Tate Gallery. In 1910 his 'Prometheus Bound' received a 'mention' at the Salon.

In March 1911, at St James' Church Sussex Gardens in Paddington, London, he was married to Janet Robinson, the daughter of Major Sir Thomas B. Robinson, then the Agent-General for Queensland in London.

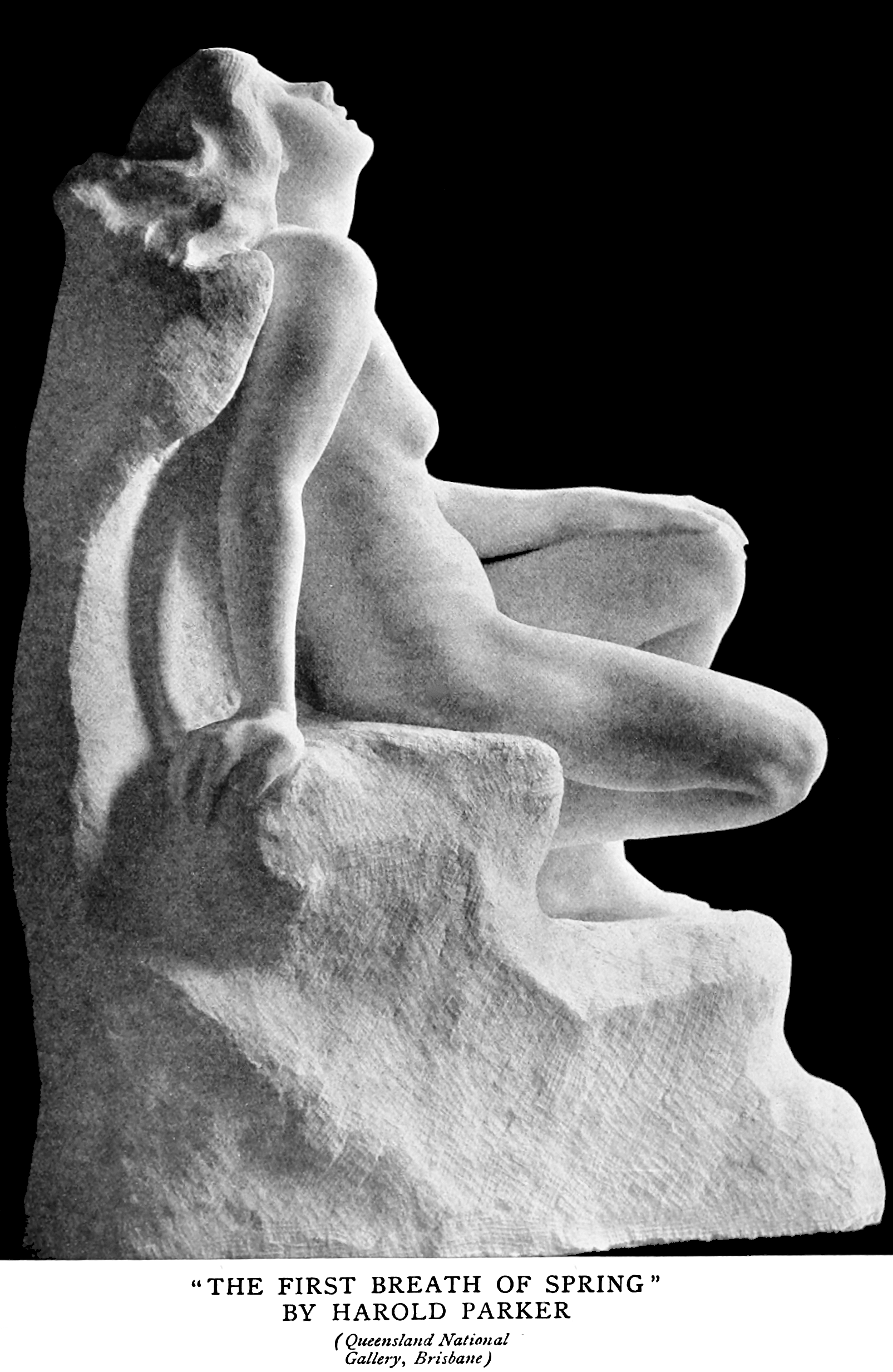
The First Breath of Spring, circa 1913, held by the Queensland Art Gallery

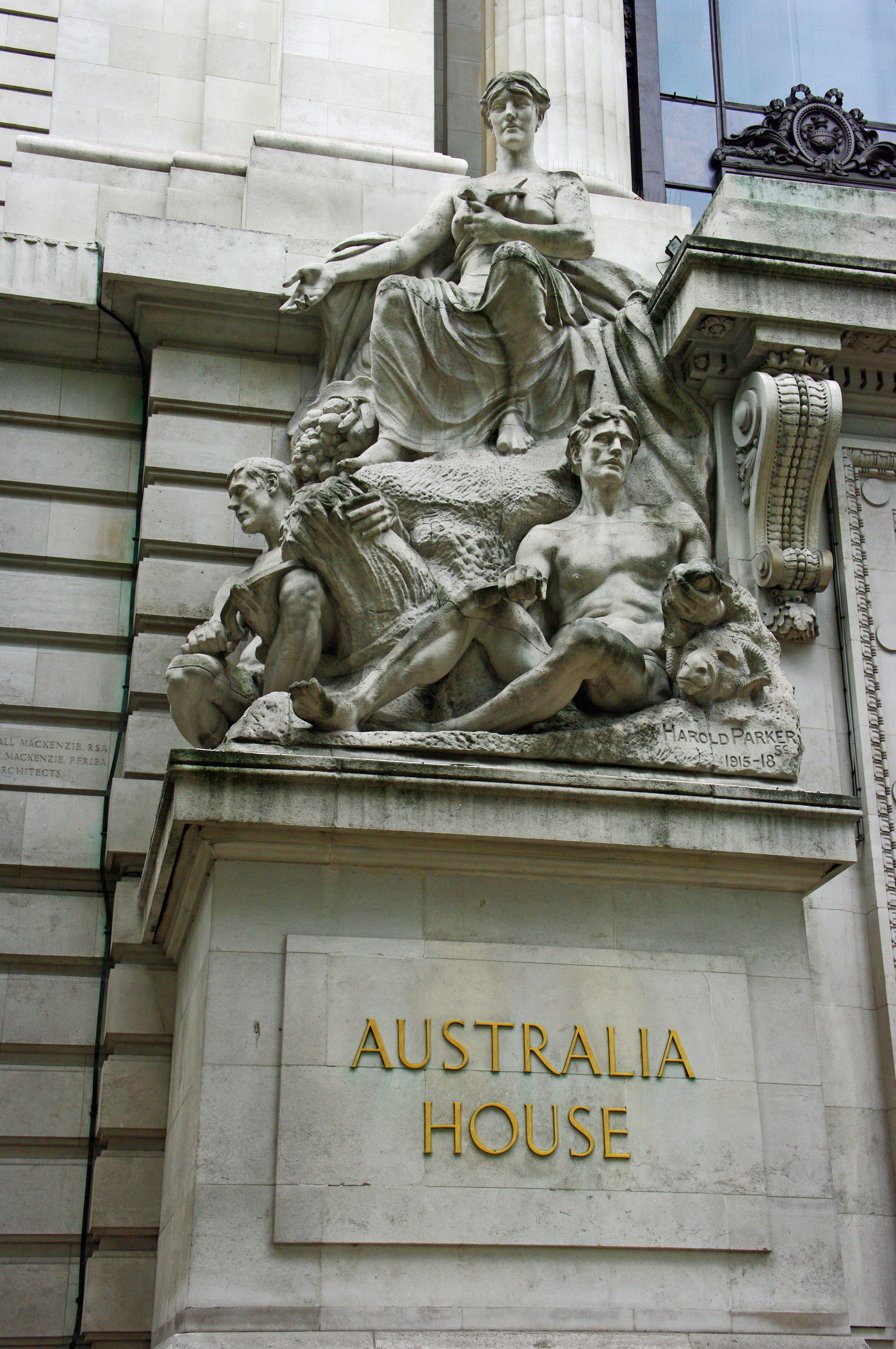
The Prosperity of Australia, Australia House, London, by Parker (1915–1918)

In 1911 the newly married Harold Parker visited Brisbane and was received enthusiastically, but apart from his First Breath of Spring to the Queensland National Art Gallery, sold none of his work. Back in London he received a major commission, two groups of figures outside Australia House: The Prosperity of Australia and The Awakening of Australia.

In 1929, his work was being shown at Paris Salon, the Royal Academy, and the Royal Scottish Academy.

In 1930, he and his wife settled in Brisbane where, overlooked for major commissions, he withdrew from public life, virtually abandoning sculpture for painting. He did, however, submit a number of designs for the reverses of the proposed coinage of Edward VIII in 1936. His image of a wren was selected for the farthing, where it remained for the rest of the coin's existence, becoming a firm and recognised favourite in Britain.

In 1937, Parker became a foundation member of, and exhibited with, Robert Menzies' anti-modernist organisation, the Australian Academy of Art.

In 1993, a retrospective of his work entitled Harold Parker, Sculptor, was held at the Queensland Art Gallery, Brisbane. Artworks by Harold Parker are held at the Queensland Art Gallery.

== Later life ==
Parker died in Brisbane on 23 April 1962. He was buried in South Brisbane Cemetery.

== Legacy ==
A circa 1907 portrait of Parker by James Peter Quinn hangs in the National Library of Australia.

His personal papers, sketchbooks, photographs and other items are held by the Fryer Library at the University of Queensland.
