= Rex Julius =

Australian official war artist of World War II

- Born: 5 June 1914; Sydney, Australia
- Died: 19 May 1944 (aged 29); Milne Bay, Territory of Papua
- Known for: Australian official war artist of World War II

Rex Julius (5 June 1914 – 19 May 1944) was an Australian official war artist of World War II. A commercial artist before the war, Julius enlisted in the Royal Australian Navy (RAN) in June 1940. He served overseas with the RAN and Royal Navy and was selected as the RAN's first official war artist in 1944 on the strength of drawings he had completed during his spare time. As an official war artist Julius prepared works in Sydney and on a corvette. He died of disease in May 1944.

== Biography ==
Rex Julius was born in Sydney on 5 June 1914. He was the son of Harry Julius, a well known caricaturist who jointly ran a commercial art businesses and later established an advertising company, and Isabel Julius. His only sibling, Ruth Julius, also became a successful artist.

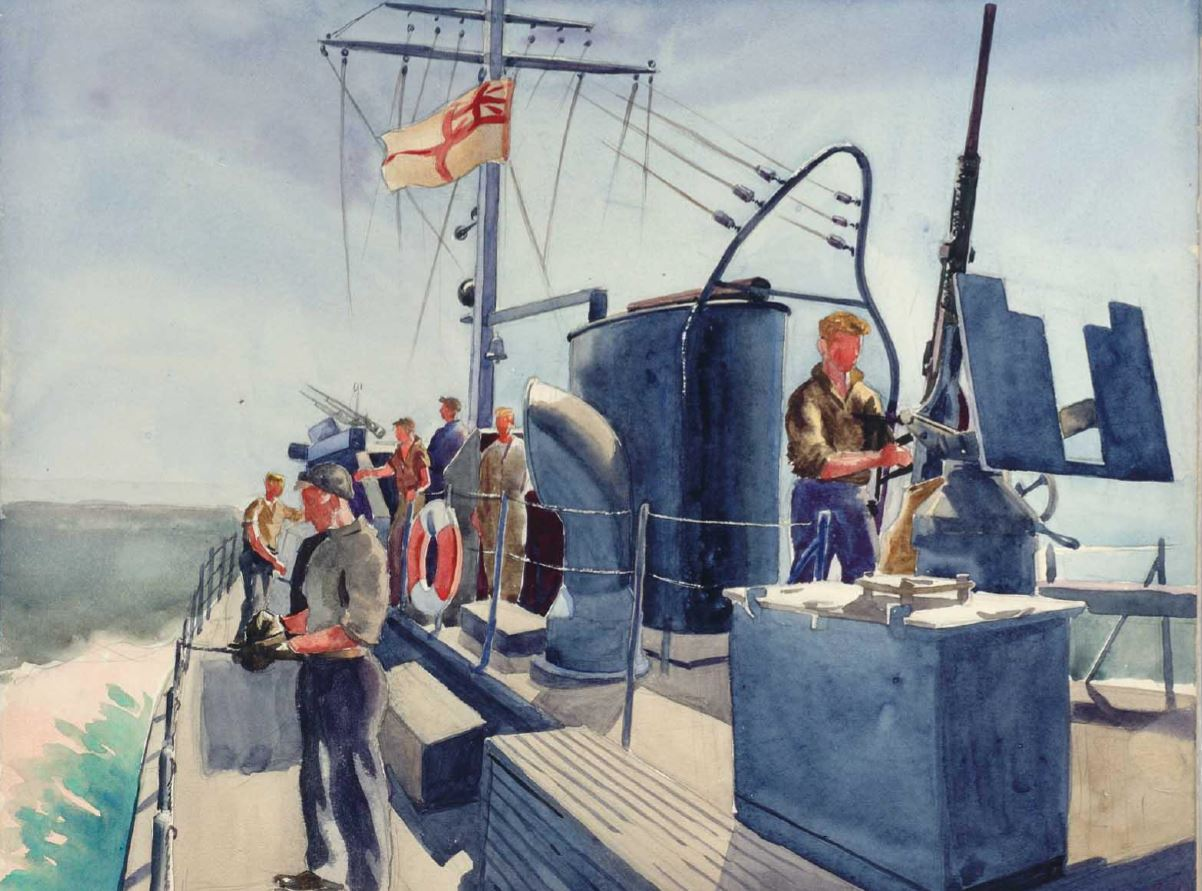
One of Julius' 1944 works depicting Fairmile B motor launch operations

Julius worked as a commercial artist prior to World War II. He joined the Royal Australian Navy (RAN) on 17 June 1940. Julius was trained for anti-submarine warfare roles.

After completing training, Julius served overseas with the Royal Navy and RAN for three years. He was promoted to the rank of able seaman on 17 June 1941.

Julius made a number of drawings during his spare time while in the navy. In October 1943 one of these works depicting Aden was exhibited in Sydney; Julius helped to hang the works shown at the exhibition during a period of leave. Julius was appointed as the first RAN official war artist in 1944 after senior officers saw a portfolio of his drawings. He was the lowest-ranked Australian official war artist of World War II, and was not promoted following his appointment.

During his time as an official war artist, Julius was initially attached to HMAS Rushcutter in Sydney. His work in this posting was focused on the operations of the RAN's Fairmile B motor launches. During his period at Rushcutter Julius also sketched members of the Women's Royal Australian Naval Service undertaking duties for the navy. Julius then travelled to New Guinea on board the corvette HMAS Lithgow, and made a series of sketches during the voyage. These works were focused on the activities of the sailors, including while they were resting.

On 19 May 1944 Julius died at Milne Bay in the Territory of Papua as the result of a throat abscess and gangrene. He is buried at Port Moresby (Bomana) War Cemetery.

Due to his short career as an official war artist and death at a young age, Julius' work is not well known. Two of his paintings are in the Australian War Memorial's collection. The National Archives of Australia holds the sketchbooks from his period as an official war artist, and has noted that "Rex Julius's charcoals and watercolour sketches capture human moments against the backdrop of a ferocious naval war".
