= Frank R. Crozier =

Australian war artist (1883–1948)

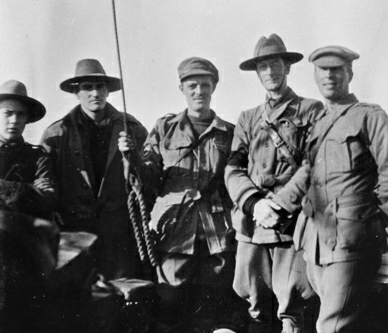
Crozier (centre) at Imbros

Francis Rossiter Crozier (c. July 1883 – 22 October 1948) was a war records artist who is represented in the Australian War Memorial's art collection along with other Australian official war artists such as H. Septimus Power, Arthur Streeton, George Washington Lambert and Ivor Hele.

== Biography ==
Crozier studied at the National Gallery of Victoria Art School in 1907 and was a member of the Charterisville artists' colony in Heidelberg, Victoria somewhere between 1900 and 1910 with Amandus Julius Fischer, then with the group centred on Clara Southern at nearby Warrandyte. He and W. B. McInnes held a private exhibition in Collins Street before leaving for Europe in 1912.

Crozier was a soldier with the Australian Imperial Force after enlisting in March 1915 where he served in the 22nd Battalion in Egypt and on the Gallipoli peninsula. Whilst at Gallipoli, he was approached (with other soldiers Ted Colles, Otho Hewitt, Cyril Leyshon and David Barker) by journalist C. E. W. Bean to help illustrate the "Anzac Book", a collection of short stories and illustrations for the troops. His artistic talent was noted by Bean, who had been given the role of official military historian and when official war artists were being commissioned by the Australian Government, Bean recommended Crozier be included in the scheme.

Crozier served in France in 1917, notably in the area around Pozières but it was only in 1918 that he was made an official war artist. Where other war artists were civilians who were attached to the army and given honorary rank, Frank Crozier was already a serving soldier, and so his contributions were part of his military duties.

== Exhibitions ==
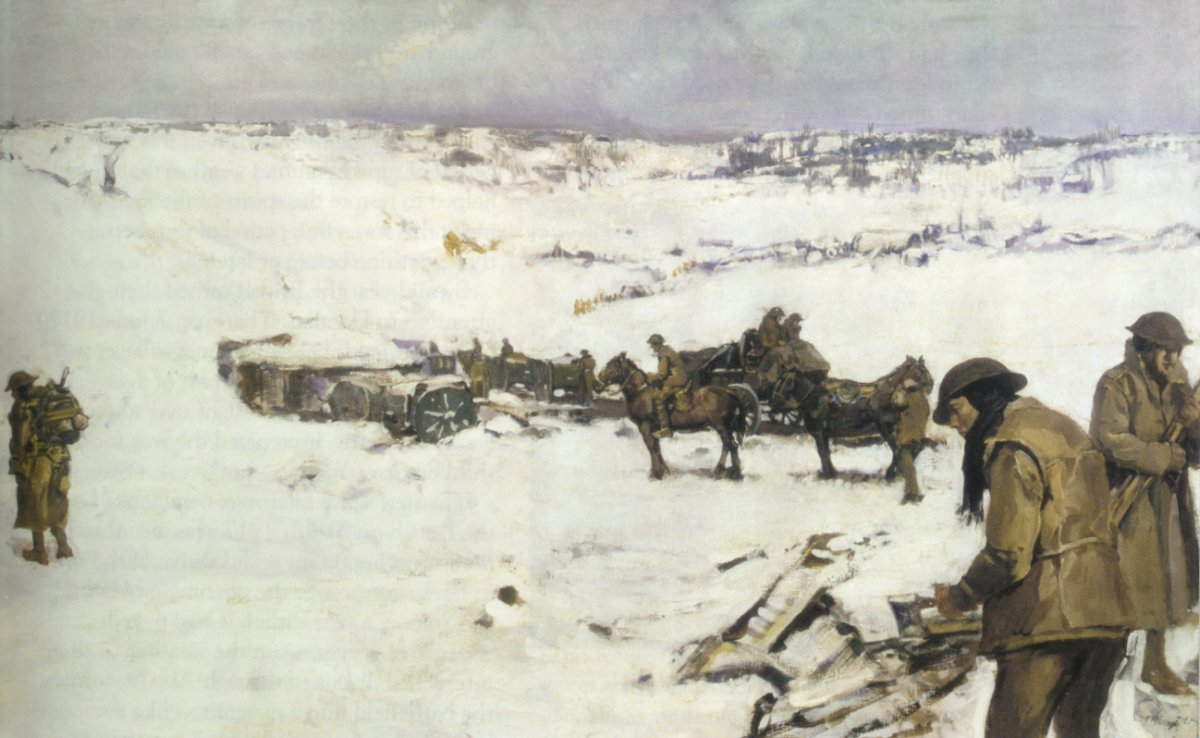
Mametz, Western Front

Post-war Crozier appears to have made a living as a prolific painter of farm scenes and landscapes

- 1928, 16–27 October: New Gallery, Elizabeth Street, Melbourne
- 1940, August: War paintings and landscapes in aid of A.I.F. 22nd Battalion Comforts Fund in a show curated by Cecily Crozier (his niece) at Velasquez Gallery, Melbourne
- 1944, 12–28 September: Sedon Galleries, 107 Elizabeth Street, Melbourne, reviewed by another War Artist, Harold Herbert

His works now fetch modest prices at auction.

Crozier died at Warrandyte on 22 October 1948.
