= Artie Carnell =

Australian rugby league footballer

Personal information
- Full name: Arthur Lewis Carnell
- Born: 24 May 1909 Dungog, New South Wales, Australia
- Died: 31 August 1942 (aged 33) Milne Bay, Territory of New Guinea

Playing information
- Position: Fullback
Club
Years	Team	Pld	T	G	FG	P
1930	North Sydney	6	0	0	0	0
- Military career
- Allegiance: Australia
- Branch: Australian Army
- Service years: 1940-1942
- Rank: Lance corporal
- Unit: 2/12th Infantry Battalion
- Conflicts: World War II; North African campaign; Siege of Tobruk; New Guinea campaign; Battle of Milne Bay

Arthur Lewis Carnell (24 May 1909 – 31 August 1942) was an Australian rugby league footballer who played in the New South Wales Rugby League for North Sydney. He died during the Second World War.

== Early life and rugby career ==
Carnell was born on 24 May 1909 in Dungog to parents Arthur Lewis and Regina Hessing Carnell. At the age of twenty-one in 1930, Carnell appeared 9 times for North Sydney as a fullback.

== Personal life and military career ==
Carnell was married and worked as a soft goods salesman.

He enlisted as a private in the Second Australian Imperial Force on 28 March 1940, and was posted to the 2/12th Infantry Battalion on 27 April. Whilst serving with the battalion in November 1940, Carnell was subject to a general court martial for being found outside his barracks without a leave pass, "disobeying a lawful command given by his superior officer", and "offering violence to his superior officer", for which he was found guilty on all counts and given detention for thirty days. He and his battalion participated in the North African campaign, and Carnell served during the Siege of Tobruk in 1941, during which he was promoted to lance corporal. The battalion was then given a rest period, during which Carnell was admitted to hospital and had his rank demoted to private upon his own request. The battalion was sent to New Guinea in August 1942, and Carnell saw combat during the Battle of Milne Bay, in which he was killed in action on 31 August 1942. Carnell was buried at Port Moresby (Bomana) War Cemetery.

== Career statistics ==
Appearances and goals by club, season and competition
Club	Season	Division	League				Other				Total			
Club	Season	Division	Apps	Tries	Goals	Points	Apps	Tries	Goals	Points	Apps	Tries	Goals	Points
North Sydney	1930	New South Wales Rugby League	6	0	0	0	0	0	0	0	6	0	0	0
Career total			6	0	0	0	0	0	0	0	6	0	0	0
