= Frank Hodgkinson =

Australian printmaker and graphic artist

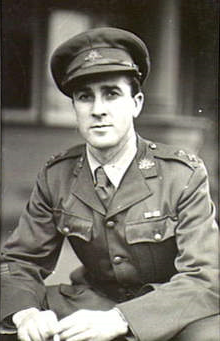
- Hodgkinson as Official War Artist
- Born: Francis George Hodgkinson; 23 April 1919; Sydney, NSW, Australia
- Died: 20 October 2001 (aged 82); Sydney, NSW, Australia
- Known for: Printmaking

Frank Hodgkinson AM (23 April 1919 – 20 October 2001) was a noted Australian printmaker, painter and graphic artist.

== Life ==
Hodgkinson was educated at Fort Street High School. After leaving he began work as a commercial artist and newspaper illustrator. He studied at the Royal Art Society of New South Wales.

At the outbreak of World War II he joined the Army and served in the Middle East, North Africa, New Guinea and Borneo as an official war artist. Following the war he studied and worked in Europe, especially Spain. He won the first Helena Rubinstein Travelling Scholarship in 1958.

Hodgkinson moved back to Australia in 1970 and in 1971 took up residence in the bush north of Melbourne at Dunmoochin on the invitation of Clifton Pugh. Pugh introduced Hodgkinson to oil viscosity printing.

He married Kate Ratten in 1972 then moved to Kenthurst, outside Sydney.

Hodgkinson became a Member of the Order of Australia in 1999 for services to the visual arts.
