= Alan Moore (war artist) =

Australian war artist during World War II

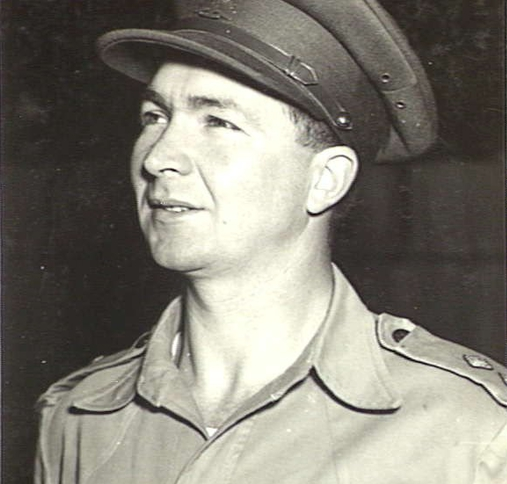
- Alan Moore in 1943
- Born: 1 August 1914; Melbourne, Australia
- Died: 24 September 2015 (aged 101); Ballarat, Australia
- Occupations: War artist, artist, art teacher
- Known for: Drawings, photographs, paintings of the Bergen-Belsen concentration camp

Alan Moore (1 August 1914 – 24 September 2015) was an Australian war artist during World War II. He is best known for his images of the Bergen-Belsen concentration camp, and the Australian War Memorial holds many of his works.

== Early life ==
Moore was born in Melbourne in 1914. He began life drawing art classes at age 16, but was forbidden by his father from continuing because the subjects were nude. He took up his studies again when he turned 18, at the National Gallery of Victoria Art School, this time completing his studies to obtain a degree. He also studied under J.S. Watkins in Sydney.

He won several art and drawing prizes in Melbourne, including the Grace Joel scholarship prize in 1942 for a nude painting.

On 14 July 1939 Moore married this first wife, Maria.

== Career ==
=== During the war ===
Moore's portrayal of the Bergen-Belsen concentration camp after it was liberated.

Moore enlisted in the Royal Australian Air Force (RAAF) in 1942, where he was tasked with drawing airplane diagrams. A problem with one leg prevented him from being aircrew. In late 1943, following recommendations from artists William Dargie and Harold Herbert, he was commissioned as an official war artist attached to the army, and given the rank of lieutenant.

Moore's first deployment as an artist was with the RAAF in Papua New Guinea in early 1944. His earlier watercolour paintings, made in Milne Bay and Goodenough Island, were destroyed by wet weather and humidity; he subsequently changed to working with oils, which were more suitable for the tropical environment.

During his time in Papua New Guinea he flew in several bombing raids to make sketches from the air.

Towards the end of World War II, he recorded war scenes from Papua New Guinea, the Middle East, Italy, England and Germany.

In 1945 Moore accompanied the British 11th Armoured Division when they liberated the Bergen-Belsen concentration camp in Germany. He spent three days sketching and painting the state of the camp, its prisoners and their captors, including Fritz Klein. It was suggested by one soldier that nobody would believe the portrayals, prompting Moore to also photograph the scenes as proof.

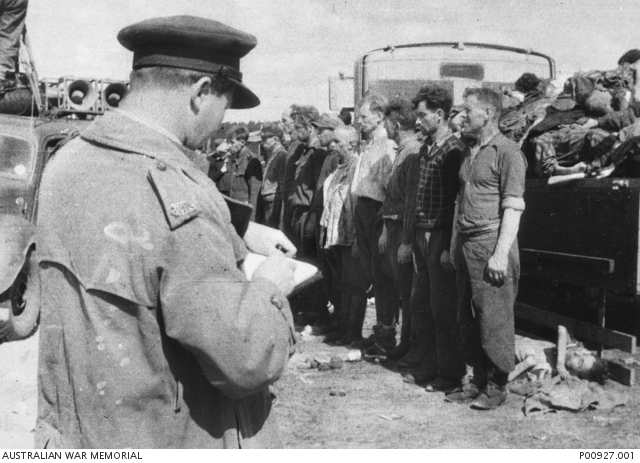
Alan Moore making a drawing of former German SS concentration camp guards (10 April 1945)

=== After the war ===
After the war Moore spent some years in Europe. He eventually returned to Melbourne, where he taught painting at Swinburne Technical College from c. 1963. Moore also painted images from his Belsen sketches and photographs. They were exhibited commercially, but failed to sell. The Australian War Memorial initially rejected the material because it did not depict Australian soldiers; however it accepted them in 1969 when they were donated by Moore. In 2013–14 the Belsen images formed the basis of a year-long exhibition at the Australian War Memorial in Canberra, which Moore himself visited at the invitation of the Memorial.

The War Memorial also commissioned Moore to paint several large portraits, including of Generals Douglas MacArthur and Arthur Samuel Allen. As of 2015 the War Memorial holds more than 200 of his works.

== Later life ==
Moore continued to paint at his studio in Avoca until he was 95, stopped by arthritis and failing vision. At about the same time he moved into a nursing home in Avoca.

He died on 24 September 2015, survived by his third wife, Alison.
