= Conway Bown =

Australian artist

- Born: 1966 (age 58–59)
- Occupation: War artist

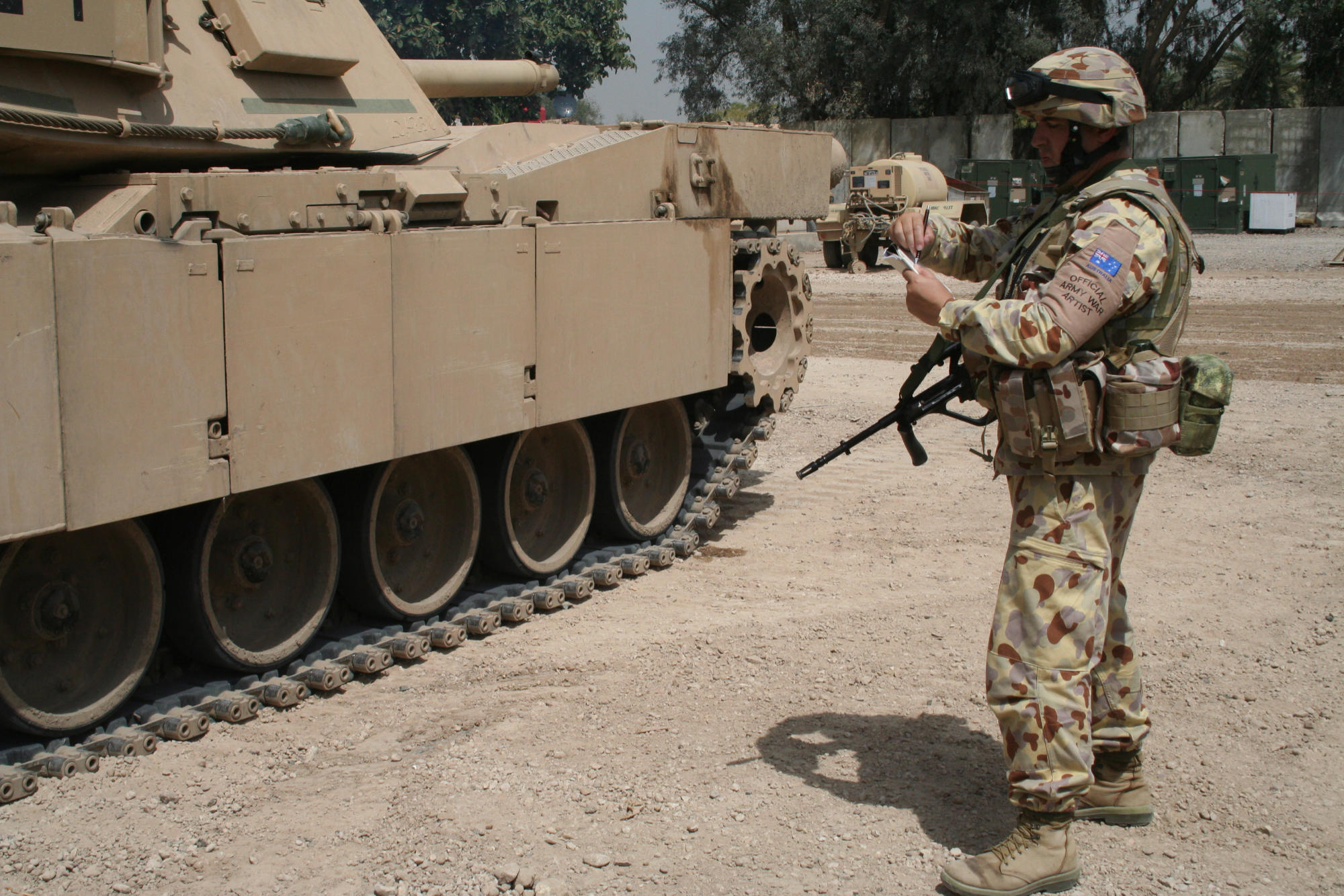
Captain Bown was the Australian Army's first uniformed Official Army War Artist to serve since Major Ivor Hele during the Korean War, seen here sketching a US Army M1A1 Abrams Main Battle Tank, Baghdad, Iraq, 2006.

Conway Bown (born 1966) is an Australian artist specialising in aviation and military subjects. His other occupations include Australian Army officer, aviation consultant, human factors facilitator and trainer, and commercial helicopter and airplane pilot. Bown was appointed by Lieutenant General Peter Leahy, Chief of Army, as the Army's official war artist during the deployment of Australian Defence Forces in Iraq in 2006. He was a CH-47 Chinook pilot in Iraq with the Australian Army in 2003 and an IAI Heron Remotely Piloted Aircraft System Air Vehicle Operator attached to the Royal Australian Air Force in Afghanistan, 2013 during which time he was also appointed by the Chief of Air Force, Air Marshal Geoff Brown as the official war artist for the Royal Australian Air Force in Afghanistan.

== Early life ==
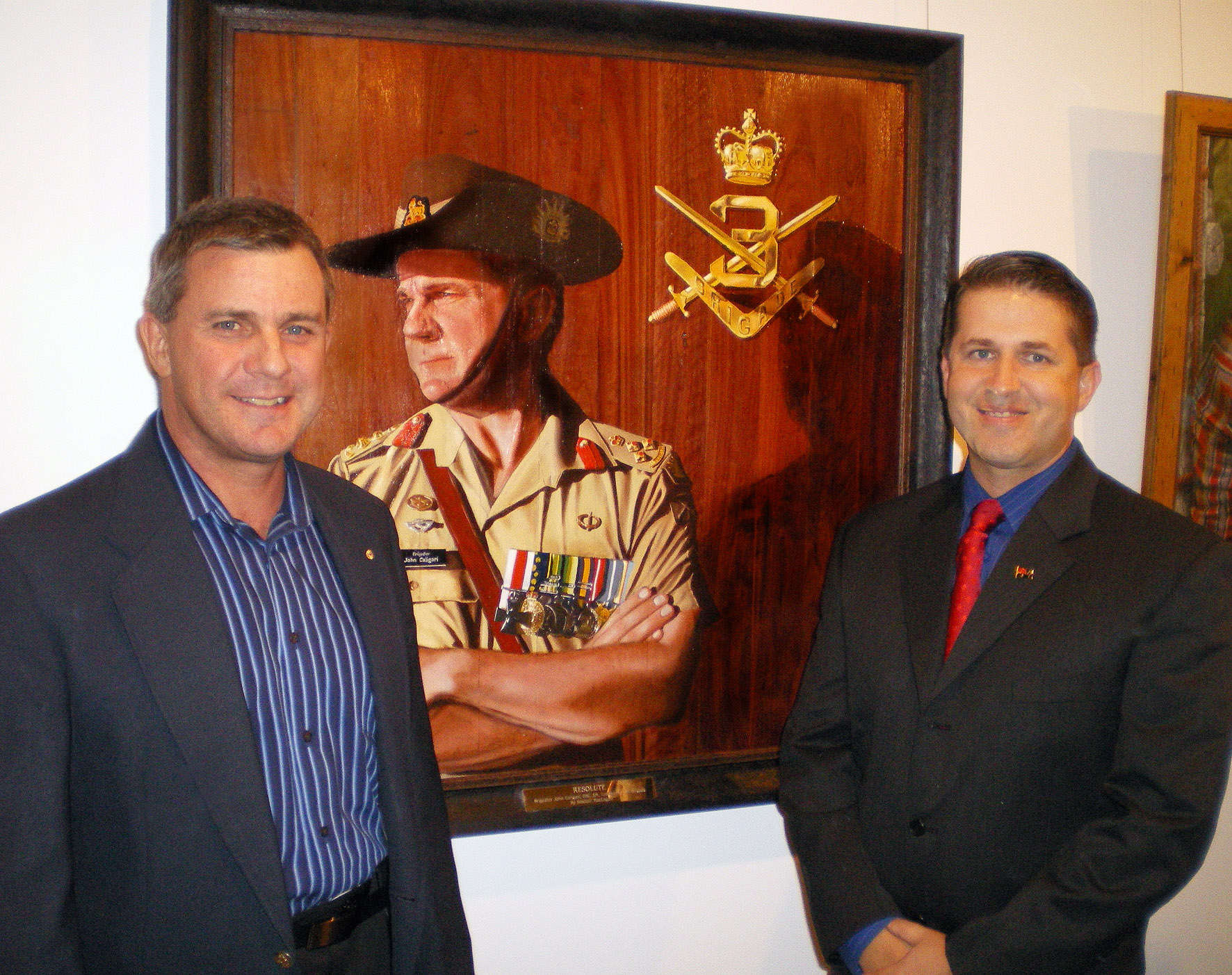
Conway Bown with the subject of his portrait, Brigadier John Caligari, Commander 3rd Brigade, at the Percival Portrait Awards, Townsville, 2008

Conway Bown was born in Sydney and educated at The Scots College before commissioning in the Australian Army in 1990 graduating as an Army helicopter pilot in 1992. In 2001, Bown transferred to the Inactive Army Reserve in order to run as a candidate in the 2001 Australian federal election competing in the electorate of Herbert in North Queensland as an independent candidate. He finished third in a field of six garnering almost 8% of the vote only behind the two major Australian political parties. During the election campaign the World Trade Center attack occurred and Australia declared its military support for the United States. Once the campaign was over, Bown re-entered the Australian Army and resumed flying duties and was deployed to East Timor in 2002 and the Middle East in 2003 as a military pilot and again in 2006 as an Official Army War Artist.

== See also ==
- Australian official war artists
