= Herbert Croft (bishop) =

English churchman (1603–1691)

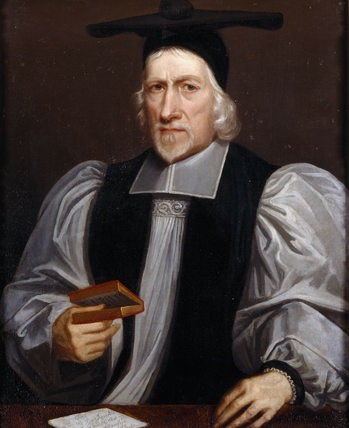
Herbert Croft, bishop of Hereford, painted about 1670 by an unknown artist. This portrait is in the hall at Croft Castle in Herefordshire.

Herbert Croft (1603–1691) was an English churchman, bishop of Hereford from 1661.

== Life ==
Croft was born on 18 May 1603 at Great Milton, Oxfordshire, his mother being then on a journey to London, the third son of Sir Herbert Croft and his wife Mary, daughter of Sir Anthony Bourne of Holt Castle. Margaret Croft (d. 1637), a lady in waiting to Elizabeth Stuart, Queen of Bohemia, was his sister. He married, before 8 April 1645, Anne Browne, the only daughter of the Very Rev. Dr. Jonathan Browne and Anne Barne Lovelace. Her half-brothers were Richard Lovelace (1618–1657) an English poet in the seventeenth century and Francis Lovelace (1621–1675), who was the second governor of the New York colony appointed by the Duke of York.

After being for some time, like his father who had converted, a member of the Roman Catholic Church, he returned to the Church of England in about 1630. He then studied at Christ Church, Oxford, graduating B.D. in 1636 and D.D. in 1640.

In 1644 he was appointed chaplain to Charles I, and obtained within a few years a prebendary's stall at Worcester, a canonry of St George's Chapel, Windsor (1641–1662), and the deanery of Hereford (1644–1661), all of which preferments he lost during the Civil War and Commonwealth.

By Charles II he was made bishop of Hereford in 1661 and also dean of the Chapel Royal (1668–1669) from which position he preached to the King, who praised him as a man from whom he never heard a bad sermon. He was one of only three bishops who voted for the impeachment of Edward Hyde, 1st Earl of Clarendon in 1667: for this, he gained much credit at Court, but was accused by Clarendon himself of "signal ingratitude", as Clarendon had been a good friend to him. Becoming disillusioned with court life he returned to his Hereford see.

Despite his youthful adherence to that faith, he was noted for his exceptional severity towards Roman Catholics, especially during the Popish Plot. No doubt for this reason, at the outset of the Plot its inventor Titus Oates claimed that the Jesuits had specially marked Croft for assassination. Why the Jesuits should be so anxious to kill a man who lacked any influence at Court and almost never went there was a question which probably did not occur to Oates, who was a stranger to the Court and to polite society generally.

== Works ==
Croft was the author of many books and pamphlets, several of them against the Roman Catholics; and one of his works, entitled The Naked Truth, or the True State of the Primitive Church (London, 1675), was celebrated in its day, and gave rise to prolonged controversy.

== Family ==
His son Herbert was created a baronet in 1671, and was the ancestor of Sir Herbert Croft, 5th Baronet, the 18th-century writer.

He died in 1691 and is buried inside the Hereford Cathedral: the tomb slab of Bishop Croft on the south-east transept is joined by clasped hands with that of Dean George Benson, who died in 1692.

Church of England titles
Preceded by Jonathan Browne	Dean of Hereford; 1644–1661	Succeeded by Thomas Hodges
Preceded by Nicholas Monck	Bishop of Hereford; 1661–1691	Succeeded by Gilbert Ironside
