= Peter Patterson (businessman) =

- Born: May 11, 1768 near Whitby, Yorkshire, England
- Died: June 12, 1851 (aged 83); Quebec
- Occupation: Businessman
- Known for: Involvement in timber, mining, and railway development

Peter Patterson (May 11, 1768 – June 12, 1851) was an English-born businessman and seigneur in Quebec.

He was born near Whitby in Yorkshire, the son of Peter Patterson. He came to Quebec in 1801 and was employed by Henry Usborne in a timber and ship building business. Patterson took over the operation of the Quebec branch when Osborne returned to England. In 1811, he acquired property at Montmorency Falls where he established a large sawmill operation. Patterson also operated facilities on the Bécancour River and the Etchemin River and also acquired cutting rights on large tracts of land in the Bois-Francs region, the Eastern Townships, and along the Ottawa River. He purchased the seigneury of Beauport in 1844. In 1846, he helped found the Quebec and Lake Superior Mining Association and served as its first president. Patterson was also president of the Quebec and Richmond Railroad Company. He died at his estate at Montmorency at the age of 83.

His daughter Mary Jane married George Benson Hall, who took over the operation at Montmorency after Patterson's death.
