= George Courtney Benson =

Australian official war artist, muralist and cartoonist

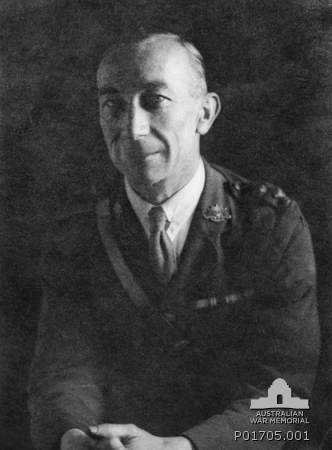
- Lieutenant George Courtney Benson in military uniform
- Born: George Courteney Benson; 1886; Collingwood, Victoria, Australia
- Died: 1960 (aged 73–74); Perth, Western Australia
- Education: National Gallery of Victoria Art School
- Known for: painter, cartoonist, muralist, art critic
- Website: George Courtney Benson DAAO

George Courtney Benson (1886–1960) was an Australian painter, muralist, newspaper critic, cartoonist, and an official war artist during World War I.

== Biography ==
George Courtney Benson was born in Collingwood, Melbourne in 1886 to Richard and Mary (née Murdoch) Benson.

He studied at the National Gallery of Victoria Art School from 1903.

Benson enlisted in the 3rd Field Artillery Brigade of the Australian Imperial Force in September 1914 and saw active duty in the Mediterranean. He took sketches of the landscape prior to the allied invasion at Gallipoli.

Benson was commissioned as an Australian official war artist in April 1918, and after the end of the war worked at the Australian War Records Section in London.

A scrapbook of 140 sketches drawn by Benson during his time in the First World War are now held by the Australian War Memorial.

He designed the commemorative vignette for the first airmail envelopes carried from England to Australia by Keith and Ross Smith in 1919.

In 1931, Benson was commissioned by the University of Western Australia to paint the ceiling beams of Winthrop Hall. He carried out further mural commissions in Perth, while also working as a critic and cartoonist for The West Australian newspaper.

Benson applied for a second commission with the Australian War Memorial at the beginning of the Second World War, but was declined due to his age (he was in his 50s at the time). Benson instead enlisted in the Citizen Military Forces and worked as a camouflage officer until 1943.

Benson was a long-standing member of the Melbourne Savage Club from 1913 to 1936.

Benson moved to Perth in 1931 and died there in 1960.

== Collections ==
- Australian War Memorial
- Castlemaine Art Museum
