= Ken McFadyen =

Kenneth Charles McFadyen (17 January 1932 – 17 March 1998) was an Australian war artist born in Preston, Victoria in 1932. He was appointed as an official war artist for the Vietnam War. He was in Vietnam for 7 months, arriving in mid-August 1967. He was stationed with the 1st Australian Task Force base at Nui Dat, however he also worked with the 1st Australian Logistical Support Group base at Vung Tau, and the Royal Australian Navy destroyer HMAS Hobart for a short period.

After the Vietnam war, he returned to Australia and continued to paint for the Australian War Memorial. He died in March 1998 as the result of a heart attack.

In 2010, a biography of selected artworks was written by Sandra Finger Lee, titled Vietnam on Canvas.

== External links and sources ==
- AWM site
- Vietnam on Canvas
