= George Benson Hall =

Canadian politician

- Born: 1780; Ireland
- Died: January 9, 1821 (aged 40–41)
- Children: George Jr.

George Benson Hall (1780 – January 9, 1821) was a naval officer, businessman and political figure in Upper Canada.

He was born in Ireland in 1780 and served in the Royal Navy during the time of the French Revolution. In 1802, he left the navy and worked on a merchant ship. When the ship became stranded in the Saint Lawrence River near Quebec City, he accepted the position of mate on the government ship Toronto. In 1804, he was given command of General Hunter on Lake Erie. In 1811, he became captain of Queen Charlotte. He set up residence in Amherstburg. In 1812, Major-General Isaac Brock named Hall commodore of Lakes Erie, Huron and Michigan. He commanded the batteries during the attack on Detroit in 1812. In 1813, when the officers of the Royal Navy arrived, he was named superintendent of the dockyard and naval stores at Amherstburg. In 1816, he was elected as a representative for Essex in the Legislative Assembly of Upper Canada and was named a justice of the peace in the Western District. He also served in the local militia, becoming major. He set up business at Amherstburg, selling hardware and construction supplies. He died there in 1821.
