= George Benson (dean) =

Dean of Hereford from 1672 to 1691

George Benson (1614 – 24 August 1692) was the prebendary and dean of Hereford from 1672 to 1691.

The Bensons were a family of considerable position with representatives in Kendal and Ambleside. John Benson left London in the 16th century around the end of the reign of Elizabeth I and settled in Great Salkeld, Cumberland. He had 13 sons and from his eldest descended the Bingley lords. George Benson senior was from the branch of the family that settled in Kendal. He was for some time Canon of Hereford, and his son, George Benson, became Canon of Worcester and Dean of Hereford.

Bishop Herbert Croft died in 1691 and is buried inside the Hereford Cathedral: the tomb slab of Bishop Croft on the south-east transept is joined by clasped hands with that of Dean George Benson, died in 1692. A Latin inscription runs from one ledger-stone to the other. It is inscribed “In Vita conjuncti” on one, “In Morte non divisi” on the other (In life united. In death not divided.) According to Alan Bray, the hand-fasting joining the tomb slabs is a symbol of a particular friendship between Croft and Benson.
