= George Benson Hall Jr. =

Canadian businessman

- Born: 1810; Amherstburg, Upper Canada
- Died: September 4, 1876 (aged 65–66); Montmorency, Quebec, Canada
- Resting place: Mount Hermon Cemetery, Sillery, Quebec, Canada
- Spouse: Mary Jane Patterson
- Father: George Benson Hall

George Benson Hall Jr. (1810 – September 4, 1876) was a businessman involved in the Quebec lumber business. On his death, the Quebec Morning Chronicle described him as "one of Quebec’s most prominent and enterprising citizens".

He was born in Amherstburg, Upper Canada, the son of George Benson Hall and Angelica Fortier. In 1843, he married Mary Jane Patterson, the daughter of Peter Patterson, and the couple had 10 children together. On the death of his father-in-law, he became seigneur for Beauport, the last person to hold that title. Hall established a milling complex at the Montmorency Falls in 1851, which eventually grew to employ members of 800 families at Beauport. He served as an alderman for Quebec City from 1853 to 1862. Hall died at Montmorency, at the time one of the richest lumber operators in Canada. He was also known for his generosity to the under-privileged of his community.

In The storied province of Quebec, the Hall sawmills at Montmorency are described as "the greatest in the world".
