= George Benson (British Army officer) =

George Benson (1750–1814) was a British soldier who saw active service during the American War of Independence.

He was promoted from lieutenant to captain in 44th Foot in 1777. In 1781, he was attached to 37th Light Infantry Company as major of brigade. He was appointed captain of a company in 66th Foot in 1785, transferred to 60th Foot as a major in 1788, and was promoted to lieutenant-colonel in 1792. He was appointed brigade major-general to the forces in the North-East District in 1795, and in 1805 was commanding an infantry brigade in the North-West District, having been confirmed in the rank of major-general in 1801. He was promoted to lieutenant general in 1808. For a few months in 1809, he was colonel of 12th Garrison Battalion. He was appointed Governor of Duncannon Fort in 1814 but died in Bath only a few weeks later.

== Bibliography ==
- War office announcements in miscellaneous issues of London Gazette, and The Gentleman's Magazine, 1777–1814
