= Charles David Jones Bryant =

Australian artist (1883–1937)

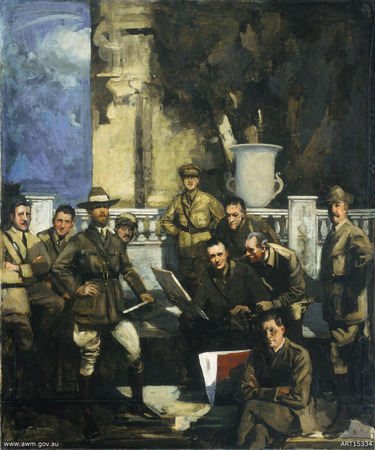
- Australian Official War Artists by George James Coates. Bryant is the second from the left, standing. The others are identified on the image's enlargement
- Born: 11 May 1883; Enmore, Sydney
- Died: 22 January 1937 (aged 53); Sydney, Australia
- Other name: Charles Bryant
- Occupation: Marine artist

Charles David Jones Bryant (11 May 1883 – 22 January 1937), known as Charles Bryant, was an Australian marine artist.

== Life and career ==
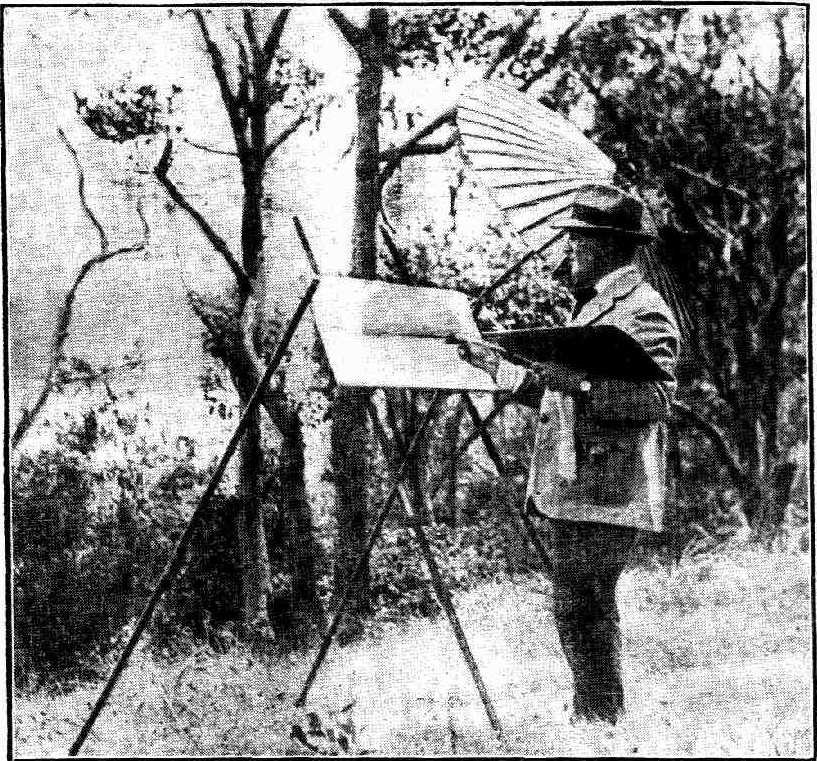
Sketching US Fleet 1925

=== Early life ===
Bryant was born at Enmore, Sydney, the fifth son of John Ambrose Bryant, storekeeper, and his wife Caroline, née Leedon. He was educated at Sydney Grammar School and studied the cello.

Sixty-nine of his paintings are in the Australian War Memorial, Canberra.

== Death ==
He was unmarried. He died at Manly, Sydney on 22 January 1937 and he was buried in the Church of England cemetery.

== Selected paintings ==
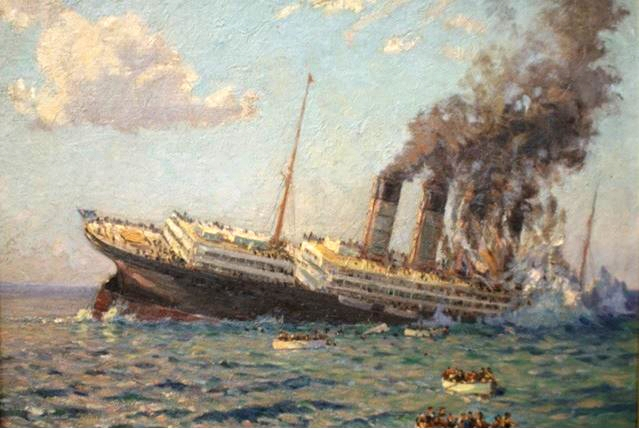
The Loss of the Lusitania

Dazzled Leave Ships, Boulogne

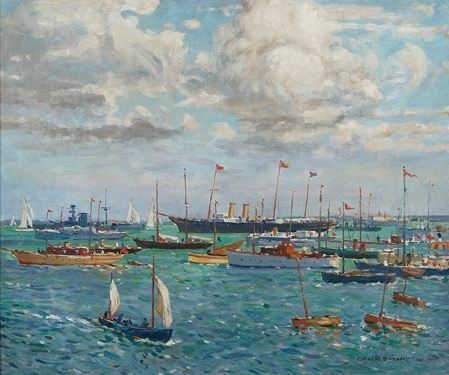
The Royal Yacht Victoria and Albert-Naval Review

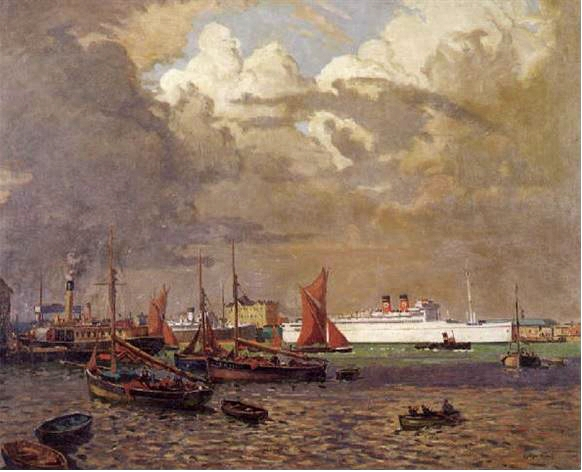
Storm Clouds Over Tilbury
