= Albert Henry Fullwood =

Australian artist

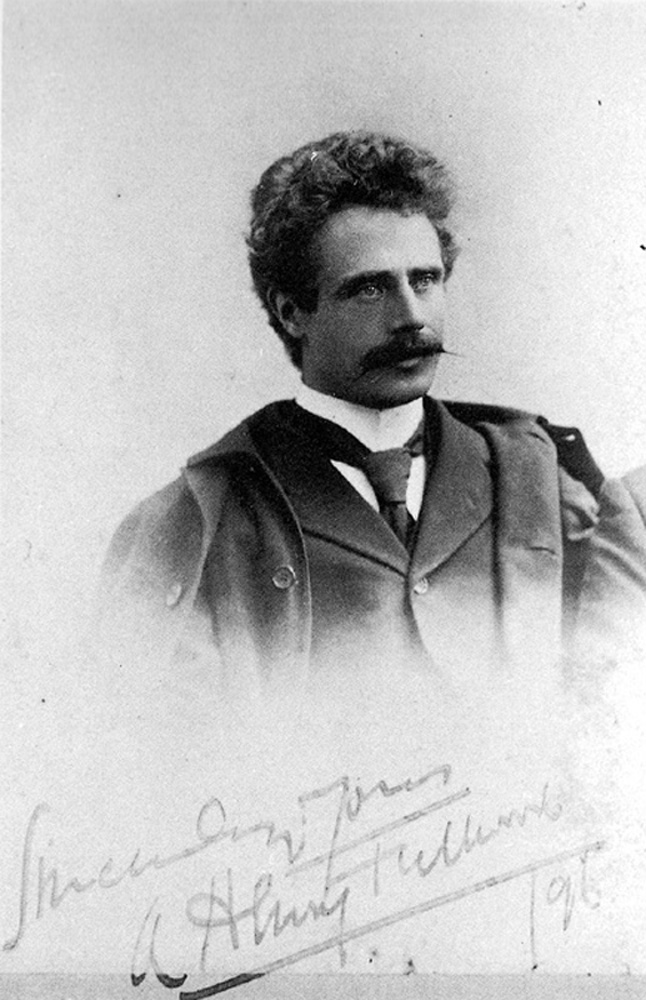
- Fullwood in 1896
- Born: 15 March 1863; Hockley, Birmingham, England
- Died: 1 October 1930 (aged 67); Waverley, New South Wales, Australia
- Resting place: Rookwood Cemetery
- Education: Birmingham Institute; Birmingham School of Landscape Art
- Known for: Painting, etching; Official war artist, World War I
- Movement: Heidelberg School
- Spouse: Clyda Blanche Newman (m. 1896)
- Elected: Society of Artists

Albert Henry Fullwood (15 March 1863 – 1 October 1930) was an Australian artist who made a significant contribution to art in Australia. He painted with Heidelberg School artists around Melbourne and moved with Tom Roberts and Arthur Streeton to live and paint at their camp in Sirius Cove, Sydney. Fullwood was the Australian official war artist to the 5th Division in the World War I.

== Biography ==
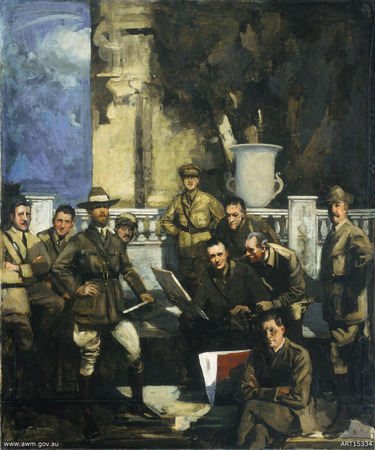
Fullwood standing fourth from the left in this group portrait of Australian official war artists, 1916-1918 by George Coates, 1920

Fullwood was born in Hockely, Birmingham, son of Frederick John Fullwood, jeweller, and his wife Emma, née Barr. From 1878, Fullwood studied art at evening classes at the Birmingham Institute. He studied art at the Birmingham School of Landscape Art at the Birmingham YMCA.

Albert Fullwood painted alongside members of the Heidelberg School at Eaglemont around 1889 to 1891. This period was a crucial time for the Heidelberg School, as it marked the peak of their plein air painting activities.

Fullwood is represented in numerous galleries including the Art Gallery of New South Wales, the National Gallery of Victoria, the Art Gallery of South Australia, the Wollongong Art Gallery, Staatliche Kunstsammlungen Dresden, the Budapest Museum of Fine Arts, and in the Australian War Memorial. A significant painting of the early Ballarat streetscape is held by Ballarat Art Gallery and a very large watercolour of Chalk Quarries (c. 1910) is held in a private collection in Doreen, Victoria.

== Personal life ==
He married Clyda Blanche Newman, daughter of photographer John Hubert Newman, on 13 October 1896 in Sydney. They had two sons, Philip L. Fullwood and Geoffrey Barr Fullwood, and a daughter Marjorie Clyda. Both Philip and Marjorie pre-deceased him.

== Gallery ==
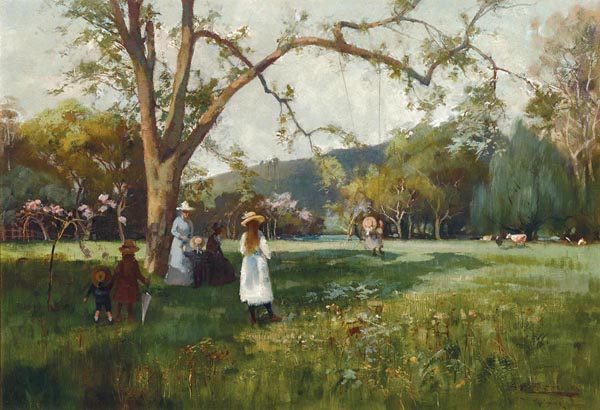
The Swing, 1892

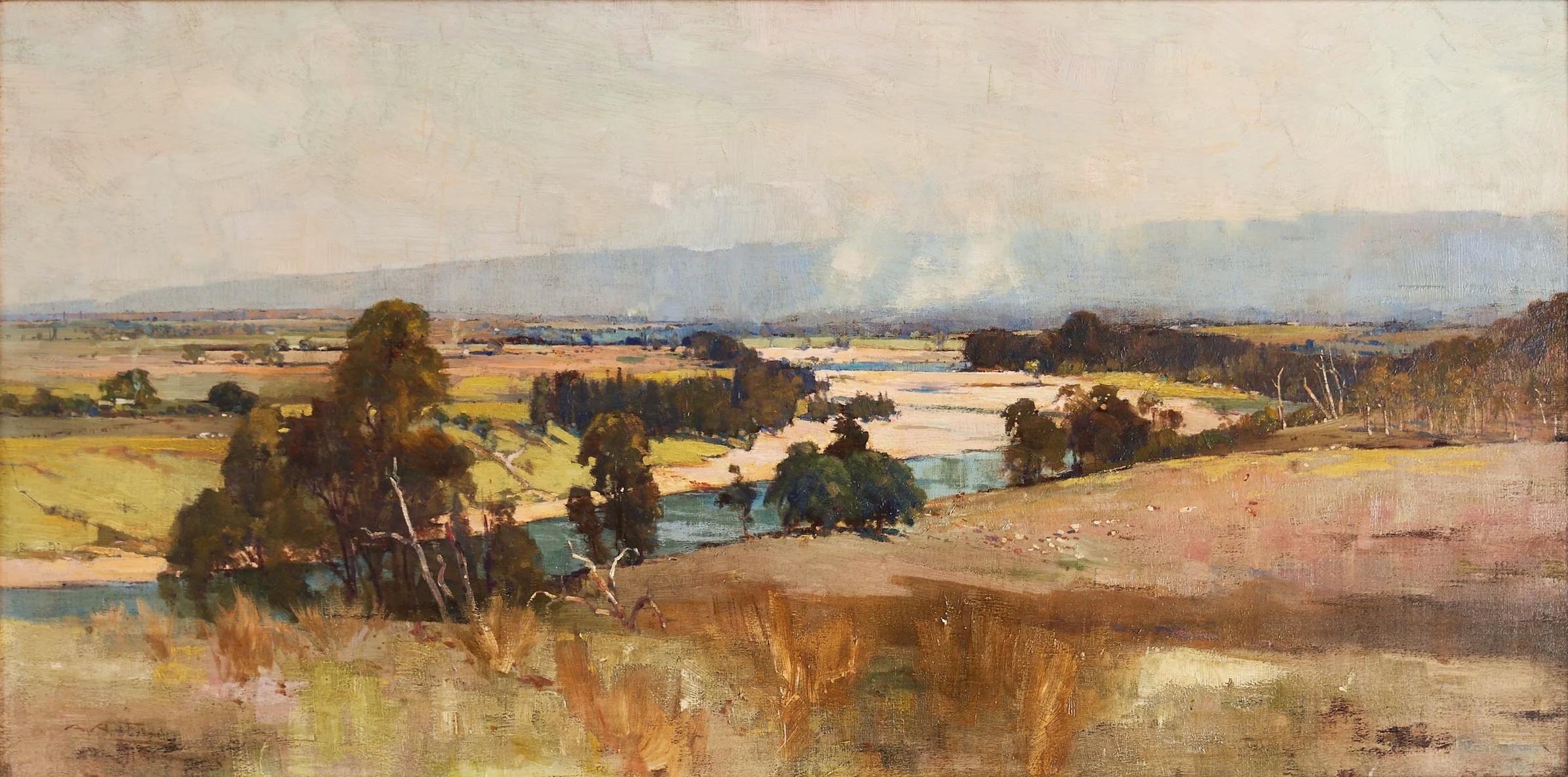
An Australian River, 1896
