= Fred Leist =

Australian artist

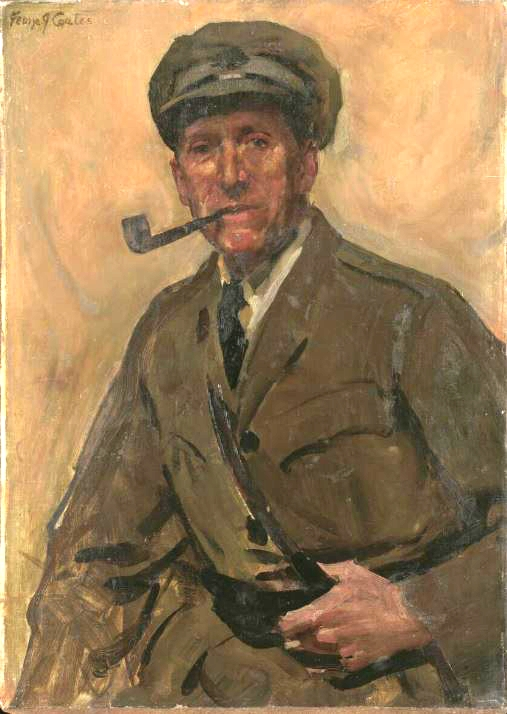
- Fred Leist (c.1925), by George James Coates
- Born: Fred William Leist; August 21, 1878; Sydney, Australia
- Died: February 18, 1945 (aged 66); Mosman, Australia
- Education: Sydney Technical College; Julian Ashton Art School,
- Known for: Paintings
- Style: Portraits

Frederick William Leist (21 August 1873, Sydney – 18 February 1945, Mosman) was an Australian artist. During the First World War, he was an official war artist with Australian forces in Europe.

== Biography ==
His father, Edward, was a builder; originally from London. He began as a furniture designer for David Jones, but decided on a career in art: studying at Sydney Technical College before entering the Julian Ashton Art School, where he studied directly under Julian Ashton, from whom he learned plein air techniques.

In the 1890s, he began working as a black-and-white artist for The Bulletin and became staff artist for The Sydney Mail. After 1900, he was also the Sydney representative for The Graphic magazine of London. Leist's illustrations also were included in books such as the 1902 Commonwealth Annual. He was one of the original members of the Society of Artists.

In 1907, he and his wife Ada went to London, so he could work directly with The Graphic, but was too overwhelmed with work to paint, so he quit. Three years later, he began exhibiting with the Royal Academy of Arts. At the start of World War I, he obtained a job designing posters for the War Office. In 1917, Leist was appointed as an official war artist to serve with the Australian Imperial Force in France.

Leist completed over 150 paintings and sketches during the war and, after his war service, contributed two large murals for the Australian Exhibition at the British Empire Exhibition held at Wembley in 1924. That same year, he was elected a member of the Royal Institute of Oil Painters. As a result of these works, Leist's popularity increased and he gained several commissions from the United States; producing similar murals in St. Augustine and Tampa. He also toured the American Southwest, visiting Texas, New Mexico and Arizona. Returning to Australia in 1926, Leist took up a position as the Head of Painting at the East Sydney Technical College. He exhibited widely and was a member of numerous art associations, and n 1937 became a foundation member of, and exhibited with, Robert Menzies' anti-modernist organisation, the Australian Academy of Art.

Leist died at Mosman, outside Sydney, in February 1945, of a cerebral thrombosis. He was survived by his wife Ada and a married daughter.

Leist is represented in the Art Gallery of New South Wales with ten works as well a representations in several private collections. Many of his paintings as a war artist are in the collection of the Australian War Memorial in Canberra. Some of his portraits are in Parliament House, Canberra.

== Gallery ==
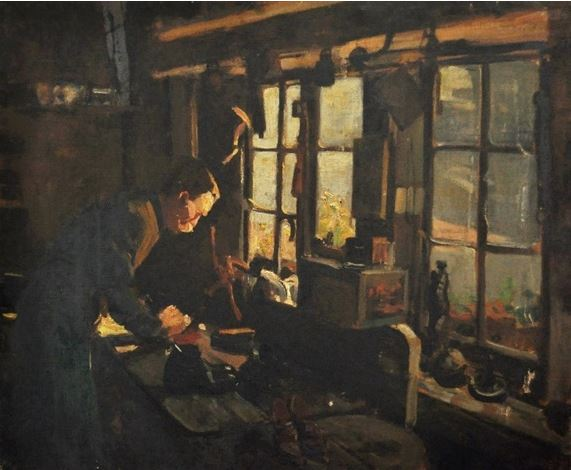
The Shoemaker

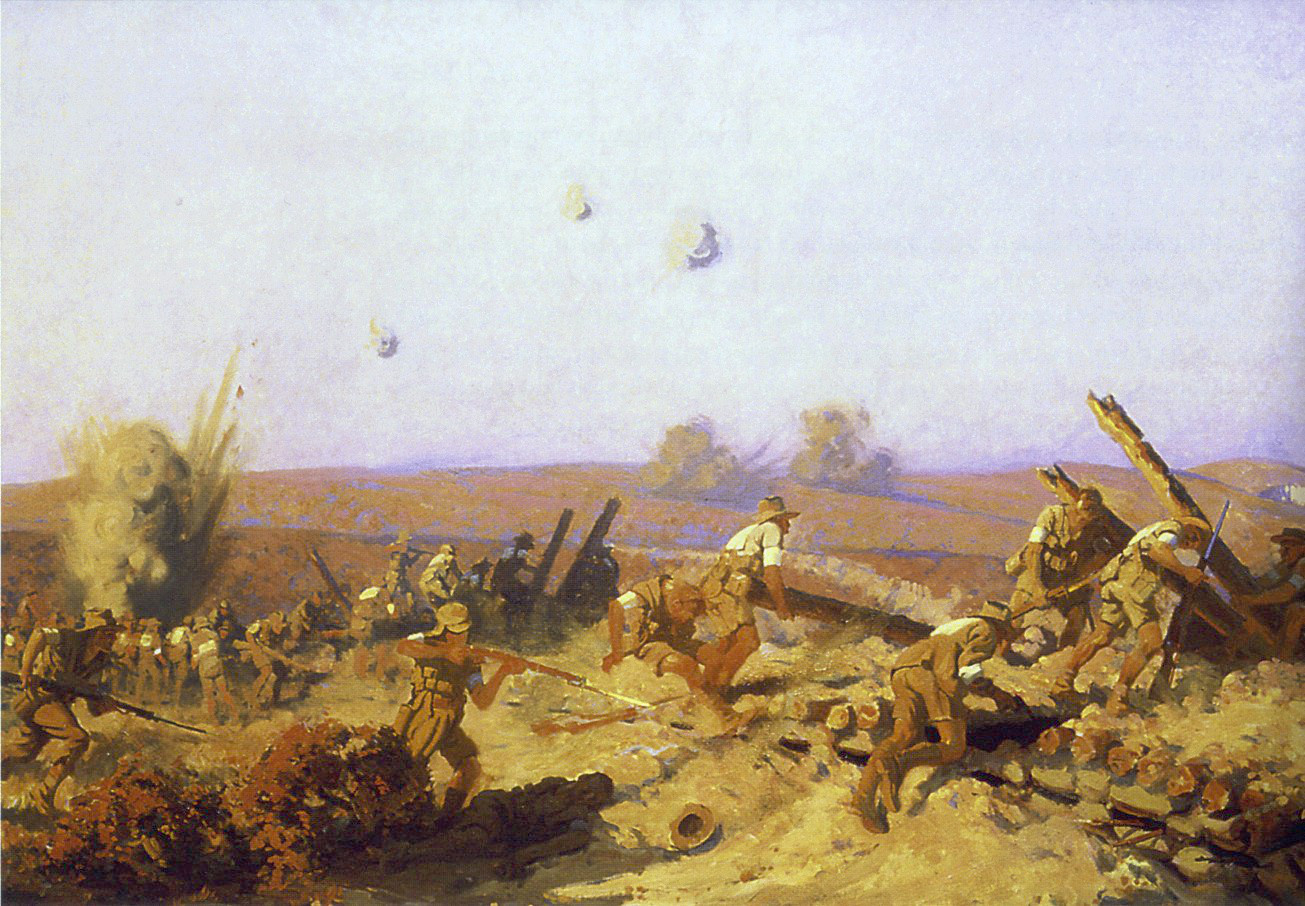
The Taking of Lone Pine, 1921. Attack of the Australian 1st Brigade during the Battle of Lone Pine, 6 August 1915

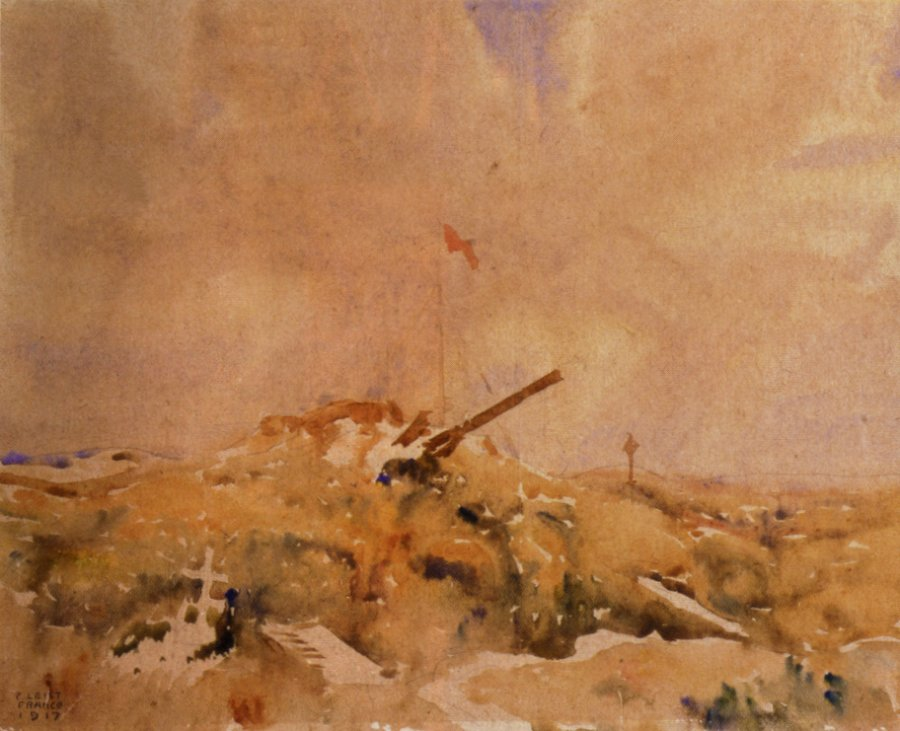
Mouquet farm, Pozières, by Fred Leist

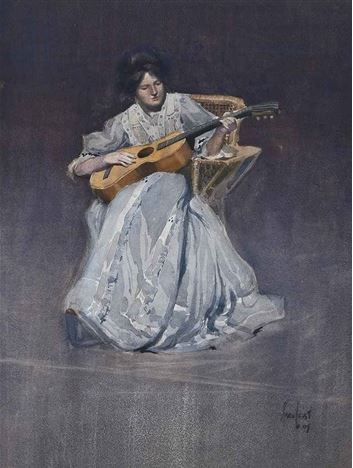
The Guitar Player

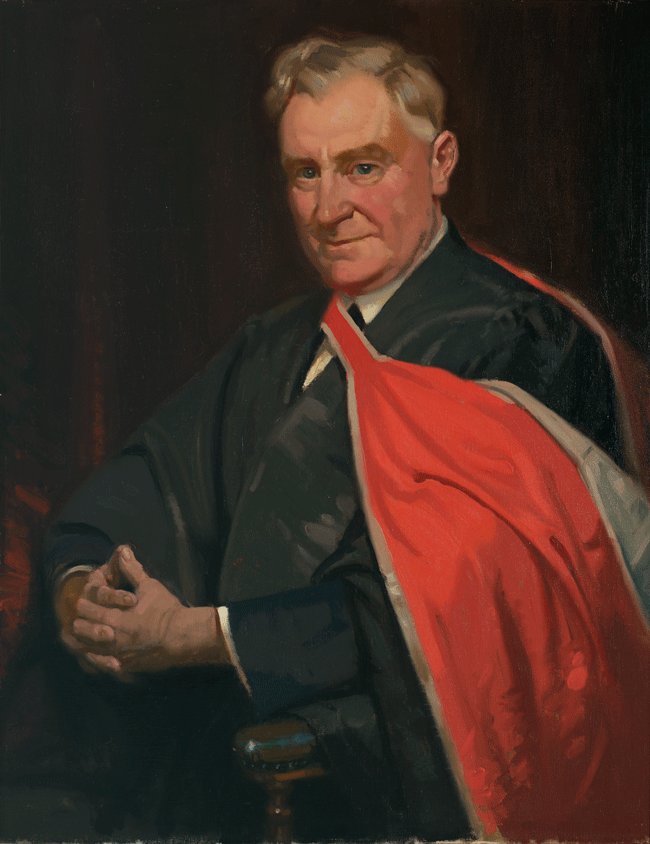
Portrait of Earle Page

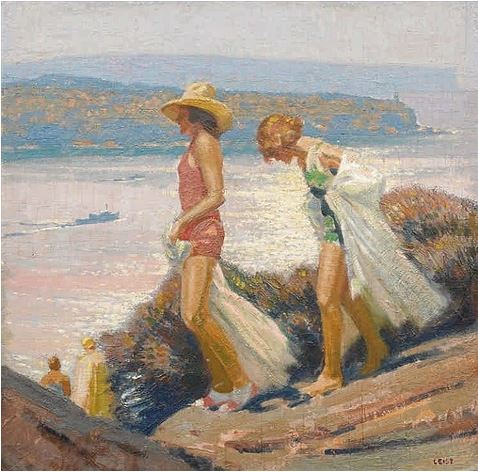
The Morning Dip

== See also ==
- Australian official war artists
- War artist
- 1916 Pioneer Exhibition Game
