= Harold Septimus Power =

New Zealand-born Australian artist

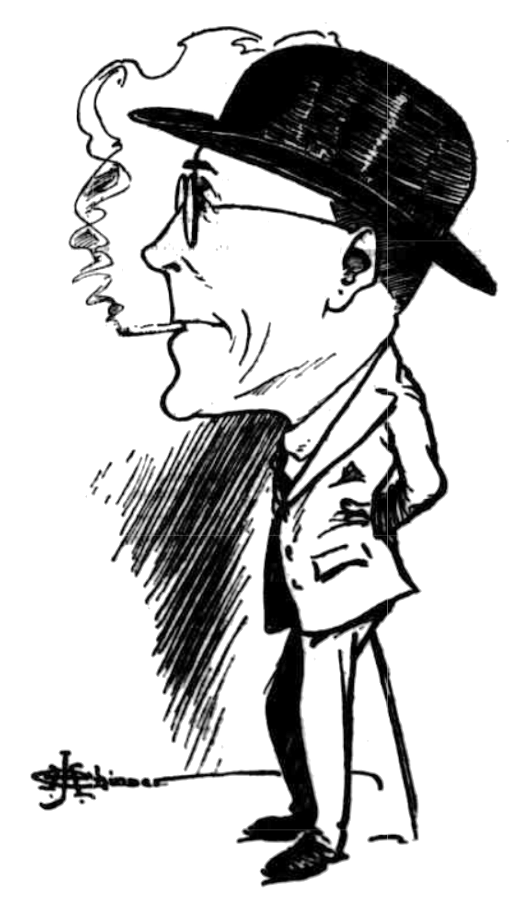
- Caricature of Power, 1920s, by John Henry Chinner from Saturday Journal, Adelaide
- Born: 31 December 1877; Dunedin, New Zealand
- Died: 3 January 1951 (aged 73); Melbourne, Australia
- Known for: illustrator, painter, war artist
- Spouses: Isabel Laura Butterworth; Margery Isabel Desmazures

Harold Septimus Power, usually known as H. Septimus Power or H. S. Power (31 December 1877 – 3 January 1951), was a New Zealand-born Australian artist, who was an official war artist for Australia in World War I.

== Early life ==
Harold Septimus Power was born on 31 December 1877, in Dunedin, New Zealand, to Peter Power, an Irish-born hatter, and his Scottish wife Jane (née Amers). His family migrated to Australia when he was six. Despite his desire to become an artist his father sent him to study veterinary surgery for four years. Septimus befriended Walter Withers who advised his father to let his son become an artist.

== Early paintings ==
After varied occupations, Power moved to Adelaide where he began his art studies. He exhibited in 1899 with the Melbourne Art Club then moved to Adelaide where he worked as an illustrator and political cartoonist for the Adelaide Observer, South Australian Register and the Adelaide Critic. In 1904, he was commissioned by the trustees of the Art Gallery of South Australia to paint an animal scene. On 17 September of the same year, he married his first wife Isabel Laura Butterworth.

Between 1905 and 1907 Power studied at the Académie Julian in Paris, and later gained a teacher's diploma at the Paris School of Arts. Settling in London, he joined the Royal Institute of Oil Painters and the Society of Animal Painters. During this time, he also exhibited at the Royal Academy of Arts, taught and painted in England, and returned to Australia in 1911 to hold his first one-man exhibition at the Guild Hall, Swanston Strreet, Melbourne, Australia in June 1913. During this exhibition he displayed oils and watercolours of rural landscapes that were used as backdrops for equine scenes and hunting. He returned to England later that year.

== World War I ==
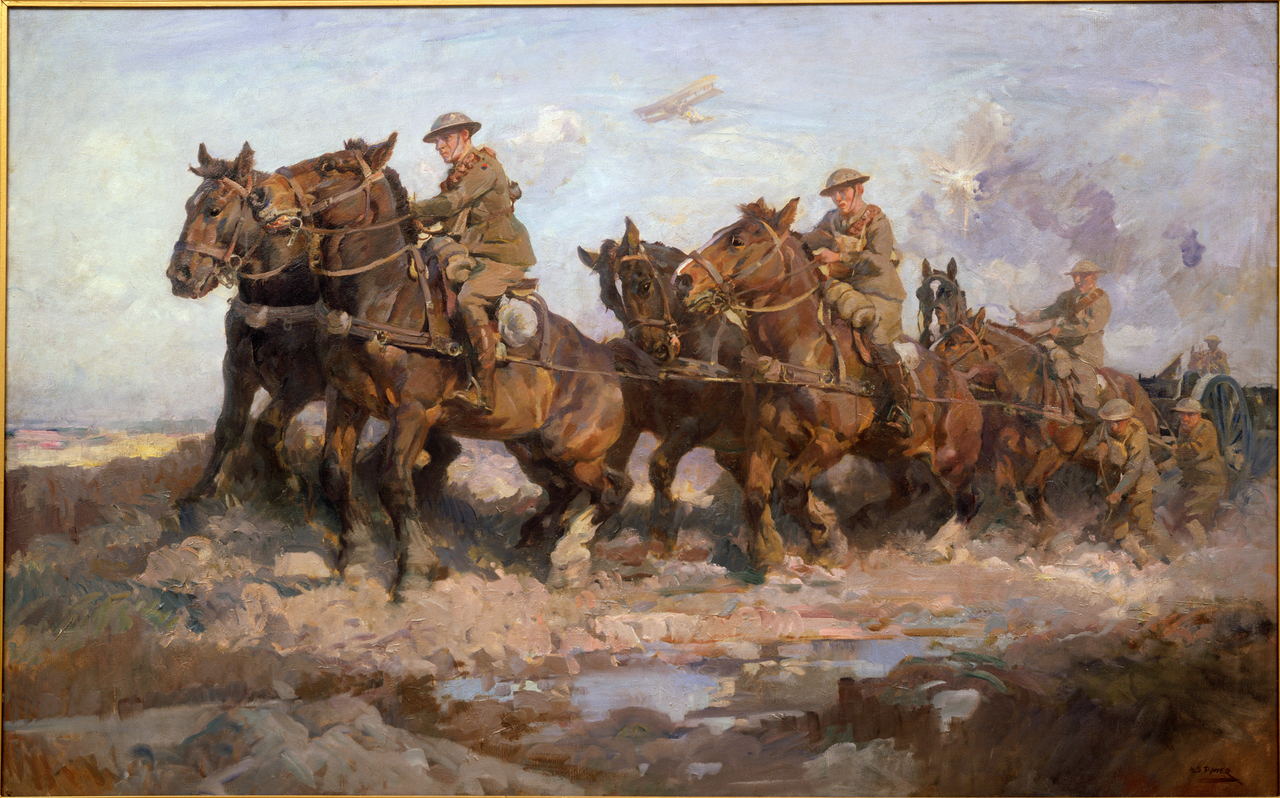
Bringing up the guns, 1917

After war broke out in the summer of 1914, the Australian government appointed official war artists to depict the activities of the Australian Imperial Force in the European theatre of war. Power was appointed in 1917 and was attached to the 1st Division, A.I.F. from September to December of that year and then again in August the following year. Official War Artist during the First World War and was renowned for his depiction of animals, in particular horses, on the field of battle. After the war, Power was contracted by the Australian War Records Section for the next two decades.

== Between the wars ==
With W. B. McInnes in 1927 Power painted the ceremonial opening of the Federal parliament. During the interwar period Power spent time both in Melbourne and overseas, exhibiting on periodic returns usually featuring a work recognised in the Royal Academy, fetching prices of prices of five hundred guineas even during the Depression (worth A$41,160 in 2021), and even by the 1970s when they were considered unfashionable they auctioned for around A$7,000.

He married his second wife Margery Isabel (née Desmazures) in Adelaide on 5 September 1936.

== After 1945 ==
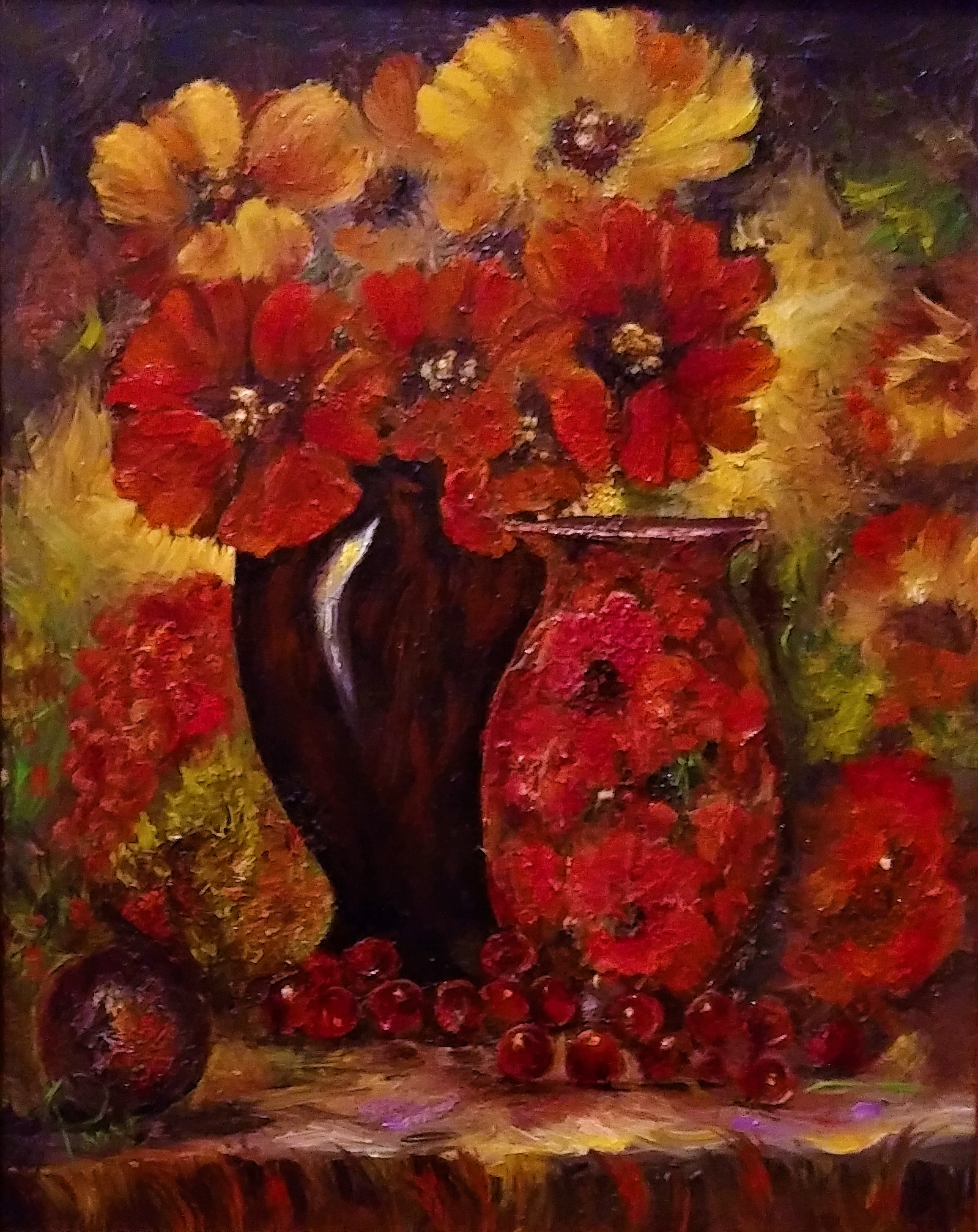
Harold Septimus Power-My Vase Arrangement-Circa 1930 to 1945.

Power was associated with conservative art as an exhibitor with Attorney-General Robert Menzies' Australian Academy of Art formed in Canberra in 1937 with Menzies as its inaugural chair. It aspired to principles of the British Academy and to advise government on artistic matters, but it failed to obtain a royal charter when opposed by the Contemporary Art Society and other modernist groups, so its last annual exhibition was in 1947.

Nevertheless, Power's work was still highly regarded and fetched good prices in 1947; Draught Horses Drinking sold for 300 guineas (a value of A$20,660 in 2021). He conducted art lessons in his Melbourne School of Art on the corner of Elizabeth Street and Little Collins Streets where he was assisted by a previous disciple and fellow realist Max Middleton. Among his students were Ambrose Griffin, Joan Lane, Cathleen Edkins and Janet Dawson who took his classes from the age of 11, between 1946 and 1949. She described him as "a funny old man [who] always had an unlit hand-rolled cigarette on his lower lip, which jiggled up and down as he talked. He was very kindly, and also a very good technician, and just taught basic things."

In March 1949 Power joined Arnold Holst, Donald Campbell, Max Middleton, Michael King and Len Ferguson on a painting expedition to Tallangatta.

In a 1950 interview headed "Modern Art Pathetic, Says Noted NZ. Artist," Power warns "beware of modern art," but is ambivalent; condemning Russell Drysdale's Melrose Prize-winning picture, Woman In a Landscape," for conveying "a wrong impression of our back country," but stressing that by "'modernists' he does not mean modern artists," admitting that "many of these are doing good work in Australia today and deserve encouragement." He welcomed artists migrating to Australia, saying they would "provide a much-needed transfusion for the nation's art."

== Death and legacy ==
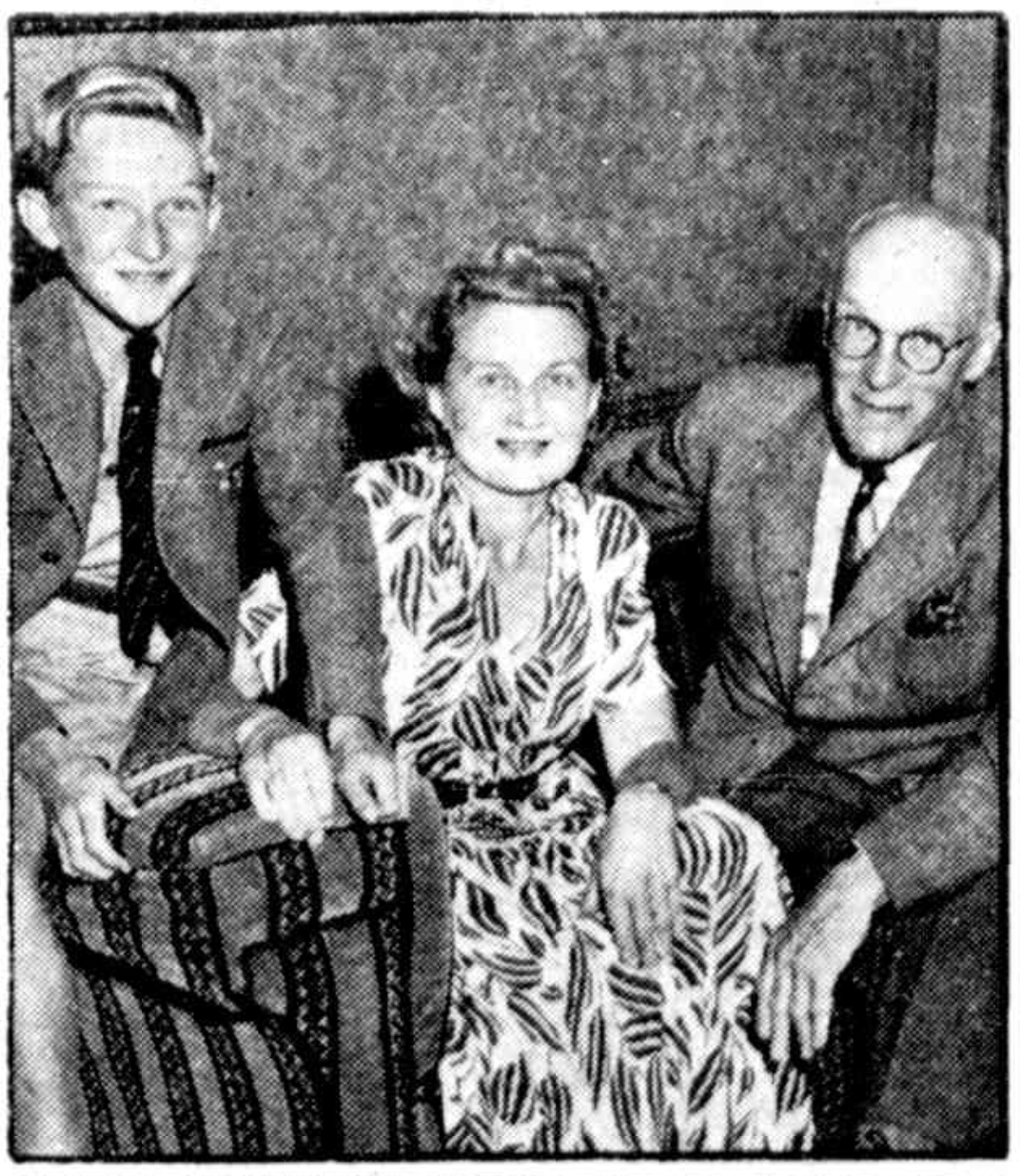
H. Septimus Power with wife Margery and son Hayden in 1950. Adelaide News photo

After a long illness, Power died at a private hospital in Richmond, Melbourne, on 3 January 1951. Announcing his death, the Adelaide News reported that "Power received higher prices for his oils and water colors than any other living Australian artist." He was buried with Presbyterian rites in Brighton cemetery. He was survived by his second wife Margery Isabel, née Desmazures and sons Harold and Hayden, the progeny of each of his marriages. He is well represented in public Australian galleries. Harold and Margery lived at 54 Crisp Street in Hampton, where in 1952 his work was exhibited shortly after his death. A full-colour copy of his 1945 painting of a beach scene at Hampton can be seen on the bayside Coastal Art Trail at Hampton.

== Reception ==
The unnamed Age newspaper critic singled out Power's work for first praise when shown at the Athenaeum Gallery in 1946 amongst others of the Australian Academy of Art;

the two paintings by H: Septimus Power predominate. Both show mastery of composition, atmosphere, color, general raclness and: vivacity: Looking at them one knows that the painter has a masterly grip of his trade. He paints things to look like what they are, and a thousand individuals will see them as real but interpret them differently. They are not photographic, or even literal; the art jargoniers will have to add to their lexicon in order to have new and approbious adjectives on hand to vilify work their candidates cannot do.

Reviewing his 1948 exhibition at Adelaide's Society of Arts gallery Esmond George in the Mail remarked that "Mr. Power invests all his work – pure landscapes, figures, and even frankly decorative material with the same intensity of conception and execution" [...] in "a completely satisfying show which one may enjoy wholeheartedly, relishing alike the downrightness of the drawing, the strength and vigor of the painting, and the rich harmony of color."

== Commissions ==
- 1904: Elder Bequest commission from the trustees of the AGSA, for an animal picture, After the Day's Toil
- 1927: Opening of the Federal parliament
- 1924: War, a mural for the Public Library of Victoria

== Collections ==
- National Gallery of Australia
- National Gallery of Victoria
- Art Gallery of New South Wales
- Art Gallery of South Australia
- Art Gallery of Western Australia
- Queensland Art Gallery
- The Sir Claude Hotchin OBE Art Collection, Shire of Narrogin

== See also ==
- Australian official war artists
- War artist
- War art

== Bibliography ==
- Holden, Robert. (1988). "Power, Harold Septimus (1877 - 1951)," Australian Dictionary of Biography, Vol. 11. Carlton, Victoria: Melbourne University Press.
- Reid, John B. (1977). Australian Artists at War: Compiled from the Australian War Memorial Collection. Volume 1. 1885–1925; Vol. 2 1940–1970. South Melbourne, Victoria: Sun Books. ISBN 978-0-7251-0254-8; OCLC 4035199
