= Australian War Records Section =

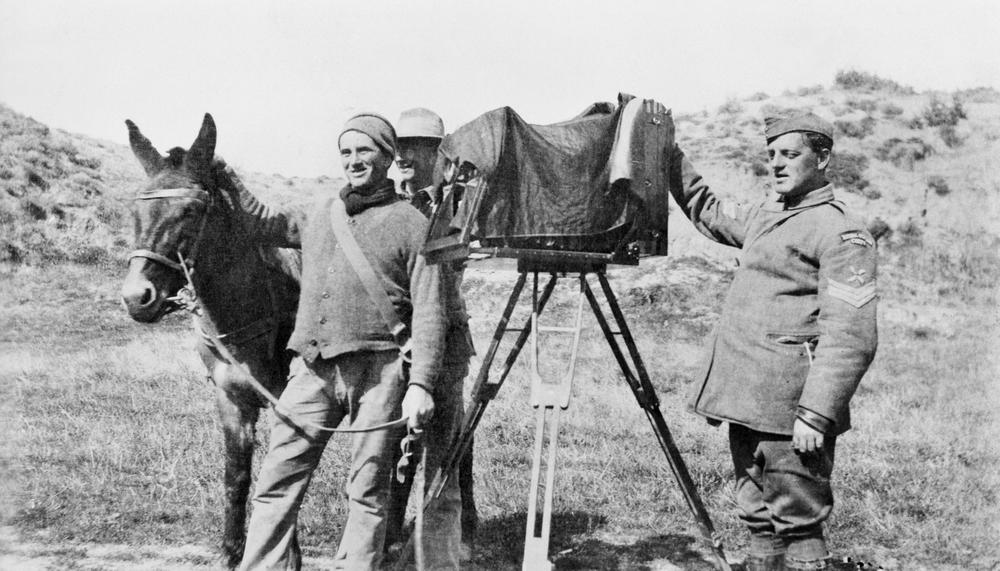
- An Australian War Records Section photographic team at Gallipoli during 1919
- Active: 1917–1919
- Country: Australia
- Role: Archival collecting

Commanders
- Notable commanders: John Treloar

The Australian War Records Section was an Australian military unit of World War I responsible for collecting and preserving records and artifacts relating to Australia's experiences in the war. The section was formed on 16 May 1917 under the command of Captain John Treloar and eventually grew to a strength of over 600 military and civilian personnel. It collected over 25,000 objects as well as paper records, photographs and works of art. In 1919 the Australian War Memorial was formed on the basis of the section's collection and Treloar was appointed its director the next year. As such, the Australian War Records Section is considered to be Memorial's parent organisation.
