= John Treloar =

John Treloar may refer to:

- John Treloar (athlete) (1928–2012)
- John Treloar (museum administrator) (1894–1952)
