= John Balfour =

John Balfour may refer to:

- John Balfour (courtier), servant of Mary, Queen of Scots
- John Balfour, 3rd Lord Balfour of Burleigh (died 1688), Scottish lord
- John Balfour, 1st Baron Kinross (1837–1905), Scottish lawyer and politician
- John Balfour, 3rd Baron Kinross (1904–1976), Scottish historian and writer
- John Balfour (bishop) (died 1488), bishop of Brechin, 1465–1488
- John Balfour (diplomat) (1894–1983), British ambassador
- John Balfour (editor) (1892–1976), Australian military historian
- John Balfour (Orkney MP) (1750–1842), British politician
- John Balfour (Queensland politician) (1820–1875), member of the Queensland Legislative Council
- John Hutton Balfour (1808–1884), Scottish botanist
