= In Your Hands =

In Your Hands may refer to:

- In Your Hands (2004 film), Danish film
- In Your Hands (2007 film), Italian film
- In Your Hands (2010 film), French film by Lola Doillon
- In Your Hands (album), album by Eliza Doolittle
- In Your Hands, album by Stella One Eleven
- In Your Hands (book), 2017 picture book written by Carole Boston Weatherford and illustrated by Brian Pinkney
- "In Your Hands", a song by the power metal band Pharaoh from the album Bury the Light
- "In Your Hands", a song by Krystal Meyers from the album Make Some Noise
- In Your Hands (song), 2024 single by Halle Bailey
- "Tere Hawaale' (lit. 'In Your Hands'), a song by Pritam and Mohit Chauhan from the 2022 Indian film Laal Singh Chaddha

== See also ==
- In Your Hands, Australians, a book by C. E. W. Bean
