= Woden Cemetery =

Cemetery in Phillip, Canberra, Australia

- Woden Cemetery Mausoleum
- Interactive map of Woden Cemetery

Details
- Established: 1936
- Location: Canberra
- Country: Australia
- Coordinates: 35.344°S 149.093°E
- Owned by: ACT Public Cemeteries Authority
- Website: Woden Cemetery
- Find a Grave: Woden Cemetery

The Woden Cemetery is the main cemetery in Canberra, the capital of Australia. It is located adjacent to the Woden Town Centre.

The cemetery opened in 1936 as the Canberra General Cemetery.

It closed for burials in 1979, but was re-opened in March 1999. Memorial gardens were opened in 1992, and the Christ the Redeemer Mausoleum, for burial in above-ground vaults, was completed in 2001.

The cemetery is nearing capacity; it was announced in February 2009 that it would be full in about 10 years, necessitating the construction of a third cemetery to service the city.

== Notable burials ==
- Ernest Albert Corey, Australian soldier in World War I
- John Linton Treloar, 2nd Director of the Australian War Memorial
- Lewis Nott, member of the Australian House of Representatives for Australian Capital Territory
- Francis Patrick Dwyer, distinguished scientist
- Gordon Upton, diplomat
- Sir George Knowles, diplomat
- Sir Robert Strachan Wallace, Vice-Chancellor of the University of Sydney
- Herbert Vere Evatt, Federal Leader of the Australian Labor Party, Justice of the Australian High Court, Chief Justice of New South Wales and President of the General Assembly of the United Nations
- Richard Norden, Australian soldier and recipient of the Victoria Cross for Australia
- Pat Power, Catholic priest and Auxiliary Bishop of Canberra and Goulburn

== War graves ==
It contains the war graves of 30 Australian service personnel of World War II – 10 soldiers and 20 airmen.
