= Richard Norden (soldier) =

Australian soldier and Victoria Cross for Australia awardee

- Born: 24 August 1948; Gundagai, New South Wales
- Died: 30 October 1972 (aged 24); Canberra, Australian Capital Territory
- Burial place: Woden Cemetery
- Military career
- Allegiance: Australia
- Branch: Australian Army
- Rank: Private
- Service number: 2412437
- Unit: 1st Battalion, Royal Australian Regiment
- Conflicts: Vietnam War; Battle of Coral–Balmoral
- Awards: Victoria Cross for Australia
- Police career
- Country: Australia
- Department: Australian Federal Police
- Service years: 1970–1972
- Rank: Constable

Richard Leslie Norden, VC (24 August 1948 – 30 October 1972 (Note: There are conflicting dates for Norden's death: his gravestone in Woden Cemetery states that he died on 31 October 1972; the National Police Memorial, the 1972/1973 ACT Police annual report, and a newspaper report of the coronial inquest into his death give the date as 30 October.)) was a soldier in the Australian Army during the Vietnam War who was awarded the Victoria Cross for Australia.

After his military service, Norden served in the Australian Capital Territory Police Force. He was killed in a motorcycle accident while on duty at the age of 24.

== Victoria Cross for Australia ==
Norden was born in Gundagai, New South Wales, on 24 August 1948 to Walter Norden and Rita Crane. He enlisted in the Australian Army on 27 April 1966, aged 18. After completing training in Australia, he deployed to South Vietnam in late 1967 as part of a reinforcement unit. After completing further combat training in Vietnam, he was assigned to the 7th Battalion, Royal Australian Regiment (7RAR) in late January 1968. He served with 7RAR for several months before being posted in-country to the 1st Battalion, Royal Australian Regiment. Norden was awarded the Distinguished Conduct Medal on 10 December 1968, for his actions during the Battle of Coral–Balmoral in Bình Dương province, South Vietnam.

On 14 May 1968, his platoon was ambushed by between eight and ten North Vietnamese People's Army of Vietnam (PAVN) soldiers, severely wounding the section commander and forward scout. Norden rushed forward under enemy fire, after expending his ammunition and killing one PAVN soldier. Recovering the downed soldier's weapon he fired at the enemy, recovering the section commander, he then returned killing one soldier who had been using the forward scout as a shield. Discovering the scout to be dead, he then returned to his section to obtain grenades, before returning a third time to clear the area and allow the scout's body to be recovered. Nineteen-year-old Norden was severely wounded in the encounter, but survived his injuries.

In 2022, the Defence Honours and Awards Appeals Tribunal recommended that Norden be posthumously awarded the Victoria Cross for Australia in lieu of the Distinguished Conduct Medal. The recommendation for the award was approved by King Charles III on 1 November 2024. The award was announced by Governor-General Sam Mostyn and Prime Minister Anthony Albanese at the Australian War Memorial on 11 November.

== Police career ==
After returning from Vietnam, Norden discharged from the Army in April 1969, having completed three years' service. He married Robynn Lenon in June 1969 and the couple established themselves in Canberra. Norden joined the Australian Capital Territory Police Force in February 1970. He died on active duty in a motorcycle collision in 1972 and was buried at Woden Cemetery.
