= Charles Bean =

Australian journalist and historian (1879–1968)

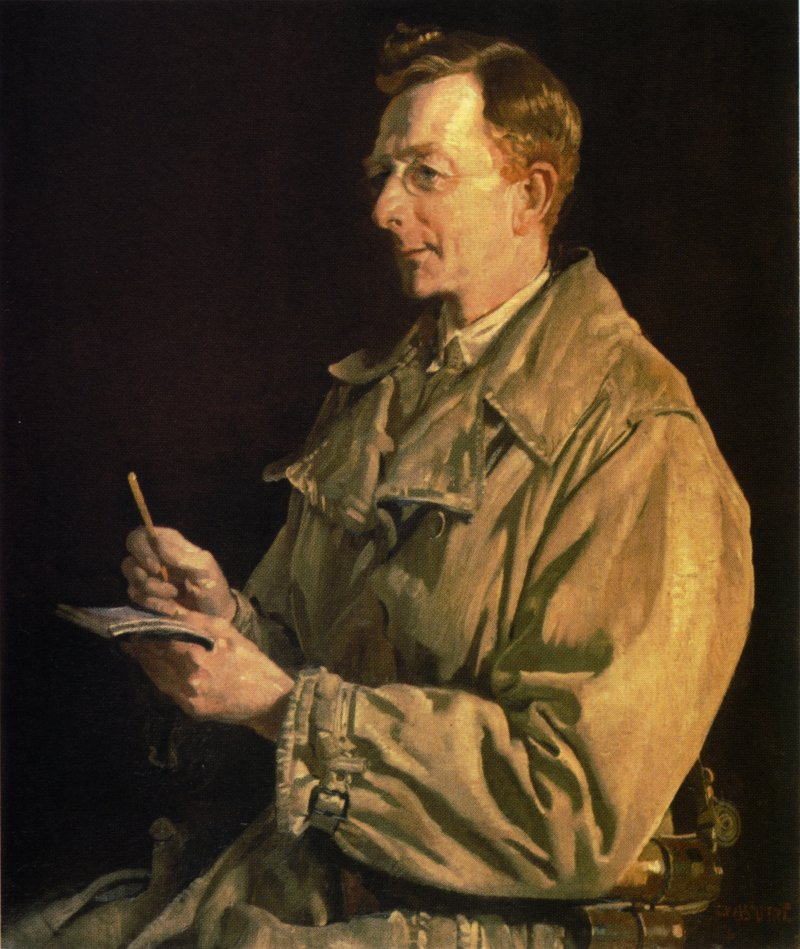
- Portrait by George Lambert, 1924
- Born: Charles Edwin Woodrow Bean; 18 November 1879; Bathurst, New South Wales
- Died: 30 August 1968 (aged 88); Concord, New South Wales, Australia
- Awards: Mentioned in despatches (1915); Chesney Gold Medal (1930)

Academic background
- Education: University of Oxford
- Influences: Banjo Paterson

Academic work
- Main interests: Australian military history First World War
- Notable works: Official History of Australia in the War of 1914–1918
- Influenced: Gavin Long; Bill Gammage

Charles Edwin Woodrow Bean (18 November 1879 – 30 August 1968), also commonly identified as C. E. W. Bean, was an Australian historian and one of Australia's official war correspondents. He was editor and principal author of the 12-volume Official History of Australia in the War of 1914–1918, and a primary advocate for establishing the Australian War Memorial (AWM).

According to the Online International Encyclopedia of the First World War, no other Australian has been more influential in shaping the way the First World War is remembered in Australia.

When Bean died on 30 August 1968, aged 88, an obituary written by Guy Harriott, associate editor of The Sydney Morning Herald and a former war correspondent, described Bean as being "one of Australia's most distinguished men of letters".

== Early life and education ==
Charles Bean was born in Bathurst, New South Wales, the first of three sons of the Reverend Edwin Bean (1851–1922), then headmaster of All Saints' College, Bathurst, and Lucy Madeline Bean, née Butler (1852–1942).

In his paper "Be Substantially Great in Thy Self: Getting to Know C.E.W. Bean: Barrister, Judge's Associate, Moral Philosopher", Geoff Lindsay SC contended that Bean's family and his formal education fostered his values which were influenced by "The Arnold Tradition". This was the model of moral values and education championed by Dr Arnold of Rugby School, which emphasised individual self-worth and qualities associated with "good character": trust and reliability, honesty, openness, self-discipline, self-reliance, independent thought and action, friendship, and concern for the common good over selfish or sectional interests". Further, according to Lindsay, Bean's preoccupation with character was consistent with, if not a reflection of, the "Arnold Tradition". Bean's formal education began in Australia at All Saints' College, Bathurst. In 1889, when Bean was nine, the family moved to England, where he was educated at Brentwood School, Essex (1891–1894), of which his father was the newly appointed headmaster. In 1894 Bean entered Clifton College, Bristol — his father's alma mater, the ethos of which was also in the tradition of Arnold.

While at Clifton, Bean developed an interest in literature and in 1898 won a scholarship to Hertford College, Oxford, taking a Masters of Arts in 1903 and a Bachelor of Civil Law in 1904. During his schooling Bean served in the volunteer corps, both at Clifton College and at Oxford University.

== Early career ==
In 1904, Bean taught at Brentwood and as a private tutor in Tenerife. Later that year he returned to Australia where he retained his parallel interests in teaching and writing, becoming an assistant master at Sydney Grammar School and writing articles for the Evening News, at that time edited by Andrew 'Banjo' Paterson.

Admitted to the New South Wales Bar in 1905, Bean commenced his legal career in Australia as a barrister, and as a judge's associate. As such he saw much of New South Wales on circuit in 1905–07 and, as Inglis noted, he was struck by the outback way of life.

In 1907, in his last days as a judge's associate, he wrote articles about "The Australian character" which were published in the Sydney Morning Herald (SMH) under the banner "Australia."

In 1908 Bean abandoned law for journalism and, at the suggestion of Paterson, applied to join the staff of the SMH In mid-1908, as a junior reporter he covered the waterside workers' strike and wrote a twelve-part series of articles on country NSW under the banner 'Barrier Railway.'

Later in 1908, as a special correspondent for the SMH on HMS Powerful, the flagship of the Royal Navy squadron in Australia, Bean reported on the visit of the United States' Great White Fleet to Australia. The following year the articles were published in book form as With the Flagship in the South in which Bean advocated the establishment of an Australian Navy Fleet. The Imperial Naval Conference of 1909 decided that Australia should be advised to form her own Fleet unit, which occurred in 1911.

In 1909, Bean was sent by the SMH to far western New South Wales to write a series of articles on the wool industry. This event reinforced his views on the Australian character — mateship, resilience and laconic good humour in the face of adversity. Bean took that sense of an independent Australian character with him to war. His articles from this experience were subsequently reworked into two books: On the Wool Track, first published in 1910, reprinted many times and now accepted as an Australian classic, and the social documentary of the Darling River, The Dreadnought of the Darling, an account of his trip down the river on a small paddle steamer, first published in 1911.

In 1910, the SMH sent Bean to London as its representative. He travelled via America, writing a series of articles about the development of the cities he visited and the provision of open spaces. While in England, he continued this interest and took the opportunity to visit town planning experiments. In Scotland he was able to witness the building of the newly-established Australian fleet's flagship, HMAS Australia, and the cruisers HMAS Melbourne and Sydney. His despatches to the SMH describing their construction were later incorporated in Flagships Three which was published in 1913.

Early in 1913, Bean returned to Sydney as a leader-writer for the SMH, continuing to write about town planning and the steps that should be taken to control the city's future development. Among his initiatives was his call for a Chair of Town Planning and Architecture at Sydney University and for the resumption of land to allow a necessary expansion of the city's railways.

Bean's "The Great Rivers" series for the SMH was published in May 1914. At the outbreak of World War I, he was investigating social conditions in Aboriginal communities, intending to publish a series of articles on that topic. By mid-1914 however, he was writing a daily commentary on the crisis in Europe.

== World War I ==
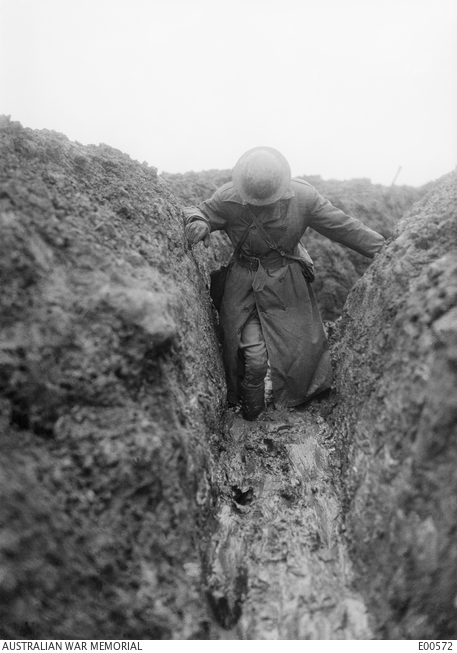
Informal portrait of Captain C E W Bean, Official War Correspondent, calf deep in the muddy Gird trench, near Gueudecourt in France, during the winter of 1916–1917.

Following the declaration of war by Britain, and Australian forces becoming involved, the Australian Government requested the Australian Journalists' Association to nominate an official correspondent to accompany the Australian Imperial Force (A.I.F). In September 1914 Bean was elected by his peers, defeating Keith Murdoch in the national ballot. He became an embedded correspondent, whose despatches, reporting on Australia's participation in the war, were to be available to all Australian newspapers and published in the Commonwealth of Australia Gazette. He was accorded the honorary mess rank of captain, provided with a batman and driver and was required to submit his despatches to the British censor. On advice, however, he retained his civilian status in order to be free of unnecessary military restrictions in carrying out his duties as a correspondent. Whatever he wrote was to be subject to rigid censorship.

Senator George Pearce, Minister for Defence in the Commonwealth Labor Government, told Bean before he sailed to the war that he hoped Bean would write the history of the Australian part in it on his return to Australia. Bean’s work habits throughout the war were predicated on gathering material for that purpose. On 21 October 1914, Bean left Australia on the troopship HMAT Orvieto, which carried Major General Bridges and his headquarters. He was accompanied by Private Arthur Bazley, his formally designated batman, who became his invaluable assistant, researcher, lifelong friend and, later, acting Director of the AWM.

During the course of the war, although Bean developed close relationships with senior commanders, he was never far from the front line, reporting on the activities of the A.I.F. he could personally witness. He would position himself with his telescope "about 1,200 yards from (or, on Gallipoli, almost right in) the frontline."

As well as reporting, Bean kept an almost daily diary record of events. These diary entries also reflected the feelings and views of an individual who witnessed those events which ranged from battles to planning and discussions in headquarters, and to men at rest and in training. He regarded his diaries as the foundation of the official history, “especially for the detail of what happened in and immediately behind the front line”. In later years he reviewed his diary comments and sometimes revised his wartime opinions, but the immediacy of each diary entry provides insight into the times and conditions as he was experiencing them.

Bean was aware of the limitations of the diaries and of eyewitness accounts. As a condition of the gift of his papers to the AWM in 1942 he stipulated that it attach to every diary and notebook a caveat which was amended in 1948 to read, in part: 'These records should ... be used with great caution, as relating only what their author, at the time of writing, believed'.

=== Egypt ===
Bean arrived in Egypt on 3 December 1914. He was asked by Senior A.I.F. Command to write a booklet, What to Know in Egypt … A Guide for Australian Soldiers, to help the troops better understand their new environment. Despite the advice contained in the guide "a handful of rowdies" was sent home from Egypt. Bean was asked to send a report covering the issue. The resulting newspaper coverage aroused concern with families in Australia and resentment towards him from among the troops in Egypt.

=== Gallipoli Campaign ===
Bean landed on Gallipoli about 10 am on 25 April 1915, a few hours after the dawn attack.

The Australian Dictionary of Biography entry on Bean notes: "Australians at home read a detailed account of the landing in the papers of 8 May. It was not by Bean, whose first dispatch was held up by the British authorities in Alexandria until 13 May, but by the English correspondent Ellis Ashmead-Bartlett. Both accounts were reprinted many times. Bean's was the more precise, for he had seen more. The English reporter betrayed surprise that untrained colonials had done so well; Bean was seeing what he hoped to see: the Australian soldiers, as he described them, were displaying qualities he had observed out in the country".

For the help he gave to wounded men under fire on the night of 8 May 1915 during the Australian charge at Krithia, Bean was recommended for the Military Cross, for which as a civilian he was not eligible. He was, however, Mentioned in Despatches. His bravery erased whatever hostility remained from his report from Egypt about those soldiers who were sent home. During the August Offensive, the last British throw at the Dardanelles, Bean was shot in the thigh. Reluctant to relinquish his post at a time of activity he refused to be evacuated from the peninsula to a hospital ship, convalescing in his dugout. The bullet remained lodged within millimetres of his femoral artery for the rest of his life.

The only Allied correspondent who stayed on Gallipoli throughout the campaign, Bean sent a stream of stories back to his newspapers. "While some editors", according to The Oxford Companion to Australian Military History, "complained that Bean’s despatches were insufficiently graphic, his writing was sober and painstakingly accurate and sought to convey within the limitations imposed on him, something of the experience of the Australians at the front." As no official photographer was appointed to cover Gallipoli, Bean also recorded events with a camera. The AWM's official photograph collection contains 1100 of his prints covering the first convoy, Egypt and Gallipoli.

Bean left Gallipoli on the night of 17 December 1915, watching and recording from the deck of HMS Grafton the final evacuation of A.I.F. troops from Anzac Cove. Bazley had left for the island of Imbros on the previous night with 150 pieces of art, prose and verse, created under conditions of extreme hardship by soldiers in the trenches, and intended for a New Year magazine. The evacuation led to a change of plan — they would be published in the form of a book. Besides acting as editor, Bean contributed photographs, drawings, and two pieces of verse: 'Abdul', portraying the Turk as an honourable opponent, and 'Non Nobis', questioning why some, including Bean himself, had survived and others not. The Anzac Book, published in London in May 1916, became a reminder of the endurance, reckless bravery and humour in adversity that epitomised 'the Anzac spirit'.

Although The Anzac Book presented a specially crafted image of the Anzac soldier, Bean did not want the historical record altered because of selective editing for its initial intended purpose. In February 1917, he wrote to the War Records Office with a suggestion that important documents – such as The Anzac Book manuscript and rejected contributions – be preserved so that they could one day be deposited in a museum. This request was granted and all contributions can now be viewed in the AWM's archives.

=== Western Front ===
In late March 1916, Bean sailed with the A.I.F. from Egypt to France, where he reported on all but one of the engagements involving Australian soldiers. As evidenced by his diary entries, he moved back and forth along the Western Front with the Australian troops, often at the frontline under fire, running from shell hole to shell hole for protection. He sent press despatches back to Australia, continuing to record military actions, conversations, interviews, and the evidence of "what actual experiences, at the point where men lay out behind hedges or on the fringe of woods, caused those on one side to creep, walk, or run forward, and the others to go back".

The website of the Sir John Monash Centre notes that Bean’s editorial opinions often contradicted military authorities, yet he was highly respected. Bean observed the "fog of war" (communication breakdown between commanders in the rear and troops at the frontline) and he described the devastating effects of shellshock. Intense artillery fire, he said, ripped away the conventions of psychological shelter and left men "with no other protection than the naked framework of their character", an experience too much for many. The Centre’s website further notes that Bean's reputation and influence grew and, in 1916, he was granted access to British Army war diaries, a privilege not extended to some British historians.

Having missed the poorly conceived and executed attack at Fromelles on 19 July 1916, the first big Australian action in France which had resulted in heavy losses, Bean was there the following morning moving among survivors getting their stories. It was the fallen at Fromelles to whom Bean dedicated his Letters from France, a selection of his first-hand observations from the Western Front published in 1917. The dedication reads; "To those other Australians who fell in the Sharpest Action their Force has known, on July 19, 1916, before Fromelles, these Memories of a Greater, but not a Braver, Battle are herewith Dedicated". The author's profits from the book were devoted to the fund for nursing back to useful citizenship Australians blinded or maimed in the war.

Several days after the battle of Fromelles ended, Bean witnessed the battle of Pozières. Over several weeks he was on the ground and sometimes in the trenches as the fighting raged. The experience shook him as it revealed the horror and destruction of modern warfare. The heavy casualties incurred there almost broke the back of the all-volunteer A.I.F. Bean recorded in his diary: 'Pozieres is one vast Australian cemetery'.

The carnage on the Somme caused Bean to conceive the idea of a memorial where Australia could commemorate its war dead and view the relics its troops collected. Bean had noticed as early as the Gallipoli campaign that Australian soldiers were avid collectors of battlefield souvenirs and imagined a museum where they would be displayed. Several months after the fighting at Pozières, Bean returned to retrace the battle where he collected the first relics for what would eventually become the AWM.

Subsequently, at Bean's prompting, the Australian War Records Section (AWRS) was established in London in May 1917, under the command of Lieutenant, later Lieutenant Colonel, John Treloar. The Section's task was to collect and organise the documentary record of the Australian forces, so that it could be preserved for Australia, rather than be absorbed into Britain's records. Over the next two years, the AWRS acquired approximately 25,000 objects, termed by Bean as 'relics', as well as paper records, photographs, film, publications, and works of art. These were brought back to Australia in 1919 and formed the basis of the collection of the AWM. Treloar, who was later appointed the AWM's Director, contributed more than any other person to the realisation of Bean's AWM vision.

Bean believed that photography was essential to the work of a modern historian, taking his own photographs on Gallipoli. On the Western Front, private cameras were banned in British armies. After lobbying, Bean succeeded in mid–1917 in having two Australians commissioned as official photographers to the A.I.F: polar adventurers Frank Hurley and Hubert Wilkins. Bean and Hurley, however, had opposing ideas, particularly over composite images some of which have become classics of the genre and priceless insights into the nature of the Great War. But for Bean the quest was for accuracy and honesty rather than artistry.

Bean, with Treloar, was also involved in the program for employing Australian war artists. Among those were Will Dyson (1880–1938) and George Lambert (1873–1930), who were already living in London, and Frank Crozier (1883–1948) who was already serving with the AIF.

In these three initiatives, namely the establishment of the AWRS, the commissioning of official Australian war artists, and the commissioning of official Australian war photographers, Captain H. C. Smart of the Australian High Commission in London played an important part.

Bean was further involved in the administration of the A.I.F., contributing to the formation and development of the A.I.F. Educational scheme for returning soldiers which was established in May 1918, with Bishop George Long as its inaugural Director of Education.

In 1918, when a successor to General Birdwood as commander of the Australian Corps was being chosen, Bean intervened on behalf of General Brudenell White, Birdwood's Chief Staff Officer. According to Chadwick, Bean was one of many who considered that White, not General John Monash, should have the corps command. In his last book, Two Men I Knew: William Bridges and Brudenell White, Founders of the A.I.F. Bean told the story, related also in volume VI of the Official History, of his own "high-intentioned but ill-judged intervention" in this matter. Kelly viewed that intervention as having been, nonetheless, motivated by what Bean believed to be in the best interests of the A.I.F.

In correspondence to Brudenell White (28 June 1918) Bean wrote about the importance to Australia of a planned repatriation of the troops: "To me repatriation means the future of Australia". Later, in October 1918, Bean urged Prime Minister, William Hughes, "that it was all important to get some plan drawn up by the A.I.F. at the earliest possible moment – put Monash in charge – Birdwood is not the man for it at all. It was urgent, I said, if they did not want a catastrophe". Ten days after the armistice, on 21 November 1918, Monash was brought to London to be Director General of the A.I.F. Department of Demobilisation and Repatriation, taking command formally on 4 December.

On 11 November 1918, Armistice Day, Bean's diary records that he returned to Fromelles with a photographer to revisit the battlefields where over two years earlier on the night of 19–20 July 1916, the Australians had endured their brutal introduction of warfare on the Western Front: "...we found the old no man's land simply full of our dead”. Bean returned to Melbourne with the returning troops on the transport Kildonan Castle in May 1919.

The Online International Encyclopedia of the First World War notes that "Bean was the only Australian correspondent who was with the A.I.F. for the duration of Australia's involvement in the War, from Gallipoli to the last battles Australia fought on the Western Front, a feat which had few parallels elsewhere in the Empire". In an article subtitled "Tribute to Mr Bean" in the Sydney Morning Herald on 9 June 1919, Sir Brudenell White said: "That man faced death more times than any other man in the A.I.F., and had no glory to look for either. What he did – and he did wonders – was done from a pure sense of duty."

== Post-war ==
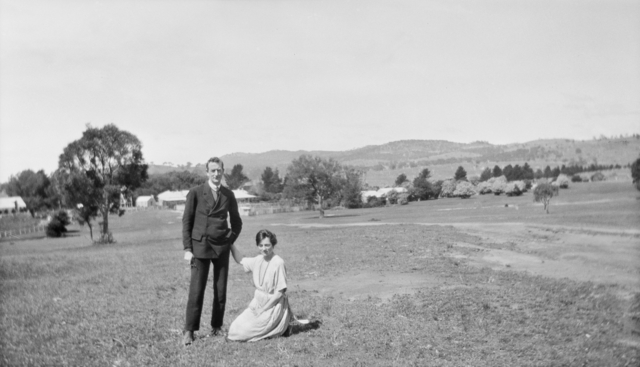
Charles and Effie Bean in the grounds of Tuggeranong Station between 1919 and 1925.

Whilst still in France at the end of 1918 when the Germans were seeking an armistice, Bean resumed thinking of a post war Australia. He took leave and in several weeks wrote and published his tract, In Your Hands, Australians, exhorting Australians to pursue the aims of peace with the dedication, organisation and tenacity with which they had fought the war. He asked "What can we do for Australia in the long peace which many who will not return have helped to win?" Of the tract he wrote: "….this little book is written to suggest a few ways in which every man, woman, and child can live for his country; ways in which you can all enlist in this great, generous fight for Australia, to place and keep your country, if possible, amongst the greatest countries in the world." In the tract Bean urged the creation of an "Anglo-Saxon nation of free, happy brilliant people". At the time of writing it, Bean was a supporter of the White Australia ideology which, Rees has noted, he [Bean] would revisit and re-evaluate over the years ahead. Inglis also noted that "The sense of values established in [Bean’s] boyhood remained constant; some of the opinions he derived from it were still changing. Before 1914 he had employed serenely the notion of an English race, and briskly defended White Australia.…By 1949 he was arguing for admission of limited numbers of immigrants from Asia rather than perpetrating a 'quite senseless colour line'." In his essay "Racism in Australia – A Contribution to the Debate", Ellis has charted Bean's shift from support for a "White Australia" before World War I to a multi-racial immigration policy after experience of two World Wars and the horror of Nazi racialism.

Bean also envisaged a future Australia as being an agrarian society with millions of farms which thinking was, according to Bolleter, "in the ascendant until the mid-twentieth century and beyond".

Despite Bean's interest at the outbreak of World War I in investigating social conditions in Aboriginal communities to publish a series of articles, Aboriginal Australians are not mentioned in his vision or referred to by him in his text, but neither are they necessarily excluded from his vision or the text. There are instances in the tract where Bean uses inclusive language such as: "…the making of a nation is in the hands of every man and woman, every boy and girl", and "We must plan for the education of every person in the State in body, mind and character".

In London prior to his departure and on the boat voyage home, Bean put into writing his proposals for the official history and for a national war museum which he envisaged not only as the repository of official pictures, photographs, maps, records, dioramas and relics from the battlefield but also as a national memorial to Australians who had died in the War.

=== The Australian Historical Mission ===
In February–March 1919, on his homeward journey, Bean led a group of eight Australians including artist George Lambert, photographer Hubert Wilkins, and scribe John Balfour on a visit to Gallipoli. The aim of the group, the Australian Historical Mission, was to carry out research on the battlefields of the 1915 Anzac campaign; create new works of art and photographs to help convey the story of the trauma and tragedy; collect sacred relics; discuss a plan for the Gallipoli war graves, and to obtain from the Turks their story of the fighting. The mission was the subject of Bean's Gallipoli Mission (1952), but he gave a good summary of its scope in a contemporary newspaper interview.

Bean returned to Australia in May 1919 after an absence of four and a half years.

=== The Official History of Australia in the War of 1914–1918 ===
With a small staff, Bean took up his appointment as official historian in 1919, based first in the rural setting of Tuggeranong homestead, near the then unbuilt Federal Capital, Canberra, and later at Victoria Barracks, Sydney. The central stipulation that Bean laid down when he became official historian was that the history was to be free from government censorship, though he had to yield when the Australian Commonwealth Naval Board insisted on removing critical passages from Volume IX, A. W. Jose's The Royal Australian Navy.

In 1916, the British War Cabinet had agreed to grant Dominion official historians access to the war diaries of all British Army units fighting on either side of a Dominion unit, as well as all headquarters that issued orders to Dominion units, including the GHQ of the British Expeditionary Force. By the end of the war, the Committee of Imperial Defence (CID) was less than willing to divulge this information, possibly fearing it would be used to criticise the conduct of the war. It took six years of persistence before Bean was allowed access and a further three years for a clerk to make copies of the enormous quantity of documents. Bean therefore had available to him resources that were denied to all British historians who were not associated with the Historical Section of the CID.

Bean was unwilling to compromise his values for personal gain or political expediency. He was not influenced by suggestions and criticism from British official historian, Sir James Edmonds, about the direction of his work. Edmonds reported to the CID that, "The general tone of Bean's narrative is deplorable from the Imperial standpoint." For his stance, it is likely that Bean was denied decorations from King George V, despite being recommended on two occasions during the war by the commander of the Australian Corps. Many years later when he was offered a knighthood, he declined.

As noted by Inglis, Bean had no exact model for the history he wanted to write. Bean wrote in "Our War History" published in The Bulletin in May 1942: "We knew that – because of the opportunities given to us during the war of seeing what really happened at the cutting edge of battle as well as headquarters - Harry Gullett, Cutlack and I had material for a new kind of war history."

According to Stanley, in writing the Official History Bean was animated by a guiding principle: that the history was to be a memorial to those who had served, suffered and died, and the question which Bean set out to explore, as he later explained, was "how did the Australian people … come through the first universally recognised test of this, their first great war?" It was answered by his conclusion that through service and sacrifice in the war "Australia became fully conscious of itself as a nation."

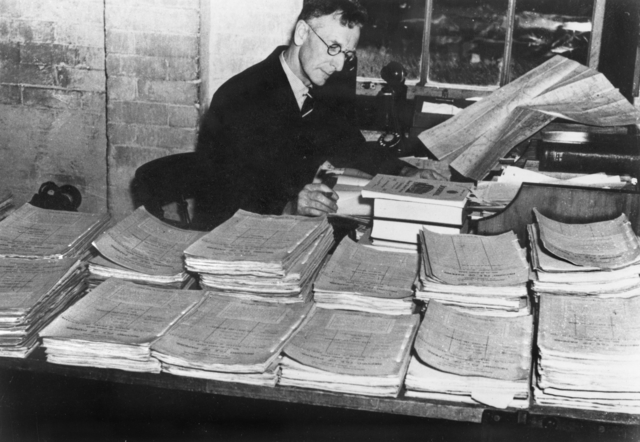
Bean studying Army documents while working on the official history in 1935

Partly reflecting his background as a journalist, Bean concentrated on both the ordinary soldier and the big themes of the First World War. The smaller size of the Australian Army contingent (240,000) allowed him to describe the action in many cases down to the level of individuals, which suited his theme that the achievement of the Australian Army was the story of those individuals as much as it was of generals or politicians.

With his interest in the Australian character, Bean used the history to describe, and in some way create, a somewhat idealised view of an Australian character that looked back at its British origins but had also broken free from the limitations of that society. As cited by Inglis, Bean later wrote in "In Your Hands, Australians": "It was character which rushed the hills at Gallipoli and held on there during the long afternoon and night, when everything seemed to have gone wrong and there was only the barest hope of success ..."

In compiling the official history archivist Piggott has recorded that "Bean and his research assistants 'digested' an outstanding quantity of official and personal records." Bean's paper to the Royal Australian Historical Society in 1938, "The Writing of the Official History of Great War – Sources, Methods and Some Conclusions" provided a list of forty main classes of records on which the work was based. One of the sources was the 45,000 responses to the 60,000 questionnaires ("Roll of Honour" forms) sent out in 1919 to the "next of kin of the fallen", for the personal footnotes of the histories which, as Bean recorded, “have been noted by critics as an interesting and peculiar feature of the work”. In the matter of maps illustrating the text, Bean also recorded that "the Australian history adopted its own system" with the creation of detailed "tiny scale" maps able to be inserted into the margin of the relevant page of the history: "It was the only means by which we could illustrate practically every movement described … on its own page (thus avoiding) the necessity for numerous large maps, likely to be quickly torn and lost".

The first two volumes of the history, The Story of Anzac, appeared in 1921 and 1924 respectively. Bean wrote both volumes, together with the next four on the A.I.F. in France. He edited the remaining six and, with H. S. Gullett, annotated the photographic volume (Volume XII). The last volume written by Bean, Volume VI, appeared in 1942. Its final paragraph recorded: "What these men did nothing can alter now. The good and the bad, the greatness and smallness of their story will stand. Whatever of glory it contains nothing now can lessen. It rises, as it will always rise, above the mists of ages, a monument to great-hearted men; and, for their nation, a possession for ever."

In Stanley's view Bean's history is neither definitive nor flawless noting that he tended to lionise those whom he admired and to omit what he found uncomfortable. Grey further noted in "Bean and official history" that the history's "strengths are those of Bean the journalist; so are its weaknesses. His focus on the tactical level and front line experiences of the men meant there was little or nothing on training, doctrine, logistics, organisation or administration – all the things that make modern armies functional and successful armies victorious." Bean had earlier conceded that "no technical histories were undertaken under the scheme drafted by me" and that the "Editor and writers had to decide with what general aims we should write. No history can tell the reader everything about its subject."

According to Pegram, historians generally agree that Bean's belief in rural virtues does not adequately explain how the AIF transformed from an organisation of neophytes in 1914 to the effective fighting force that contributed to Germany’s defeat in 1918.

Nevertheless, Stanley maintained that while later studies have elaborated, revised and challenged many aspects of it, the Official History retains its integrity as the single greatest source of interpretation of Australia’s part in the First World War.

Bean also contributed the Australian section to volume three of Sir Charles Lucas' The Empire at War, Oxford, 1924.

=== Australian War Memorial ===
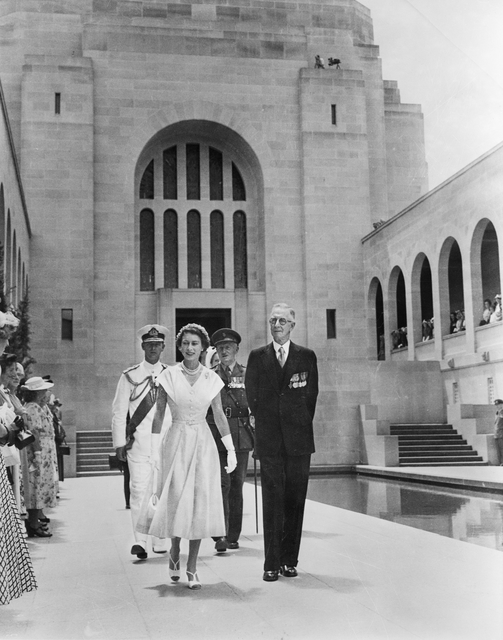
Bean accompanying Queen Elizabeth II during her visit to the Australian War Memorial on 16 February 1954

Bean's idea was to create a national memorial where families and friends could grieve for those buried in places far away, as well as being a place that would contribute to an understanding of war itself. Accordingly, the style of the AWM reflects Bean's desire for the building to at once be museum, monument, memorial, temple and shrine to Australians who lost their lives and suffered as a result of war. Bean's vision for the AWM appears on the wall inside its front doors: "Here is their spirit, in the heart of the land they loved; and here we guard the record which they themselves made."

The AWM had been Bean's conception emerging from the horror that the A.I.F. had endured at Pozieres in 1916. In 1919 an Australian War Museum committee was established with the hope that Bean would become the first director of the Memorial (the term now being used) as well as official historian, but it was evident to Bean that he could not undertake both tasks. H. S. Gullett (later Sir Henry), who had been in charge of the AWRS in Egypt and a war correspondent in Palestine, was appointed director. Bean and Lieutenant-Colonel Treloar conceived that the memorial and museum functions were philosophically and operationally inseparable and, with Gullett, they were to guide its creation and operations over a 40 year period.

From selecting the site in 1919, Bean worked on creating the AWM, and was present when the building opened on 11 November 1941. He served continuously as a member of the AWM Board from 1919 and was its chairman from 1952 to 1959 remaining on the Board until 1963. As the general editor and principal author of the Official History Bean was also associated with the AWM as publisher and as a donor and adviser on the collections including post-war art commissions. According to Piggott "Dr Bean ..more than any other individual, expounded the philosophy of commemoration through exhibits, documentary collections and the roll of honour”. In the 1950s Bean drew up a list of exhibition principles, suggesting among other things that the galleries should "avoid glorification of war and boasting of victory" and "perpetuating enmity … for both moral and national reasons and because those who have fought in wars are generally strongest in their desire to prevent war."

== Further post-war works: war-related; civil-related; publications ==
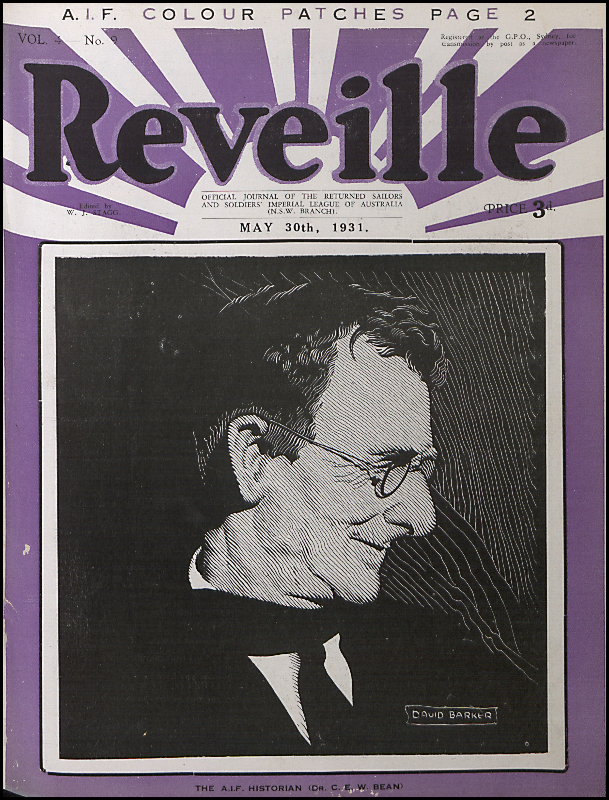
Charles Bean featured on the cover of the May 1931 issue of Reveille

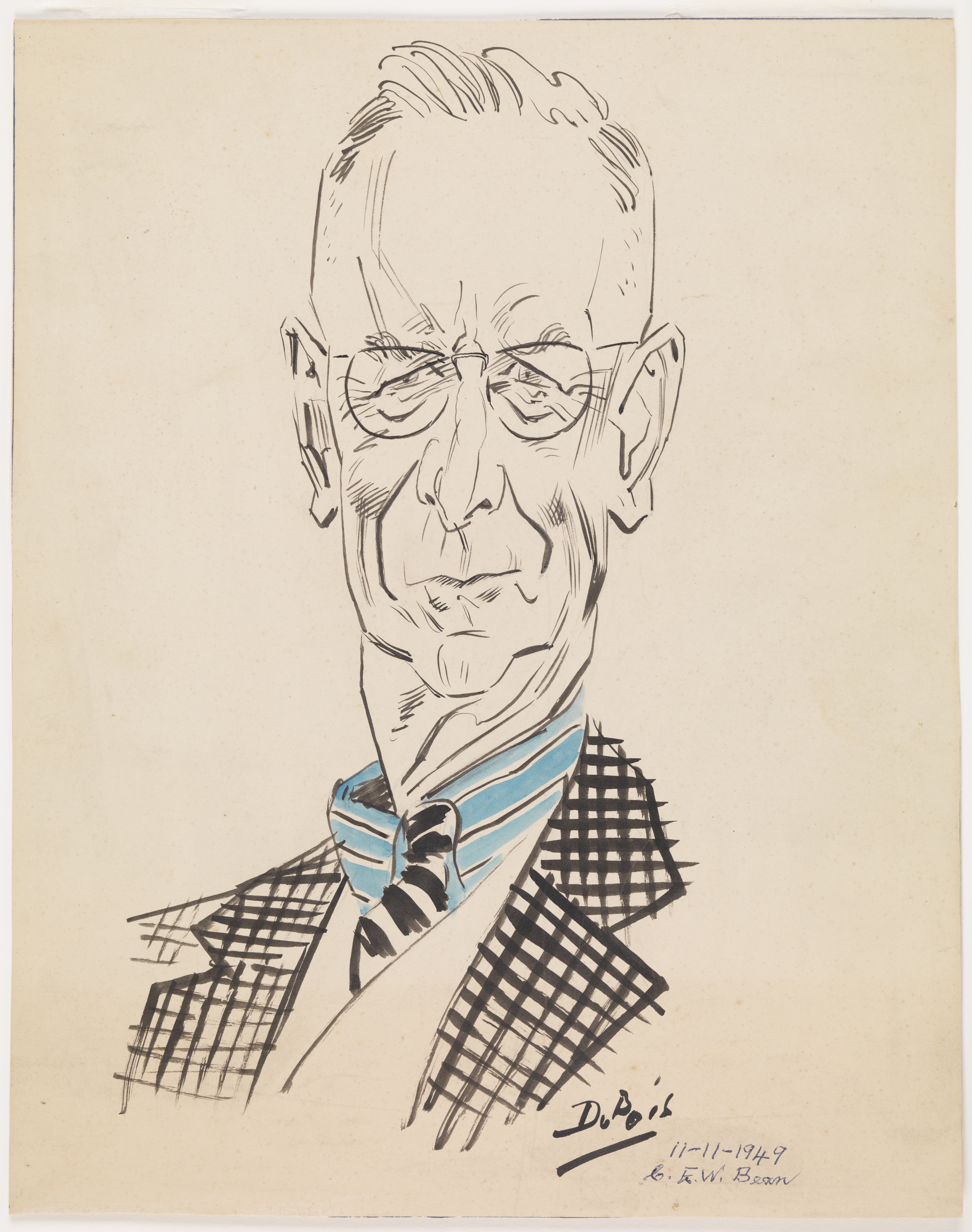
Charles Bean, Australia, 1944, by Cyril Dubois

Both during and after the years in which he was engaged in the writing and editing of the Official History and in his work with the AWM, Bean promoted his ideals in various fields of national interest. Most reflected his concern to improve the nature of Australian society and the welfare of its people, particularly in relation to education, causing him to be described by Rees as a "social missionary". Other Bean interests were linked with his wartime and pre-war occupations.

In some of the societies and organisations formed around these interests and occupations Bean held official positions: councillor of the National Fitness Council of New South Wales for ten years; councillor of the Town Planning Association of New South Wales; president of the New South Wales Institute of Journalists; vice–president of the Recreation and Leadership Movement; chairman of the NSW Standing Committee on Community Centres; member of the Australian Services Education Council; chairman of the Promotions Appeal Board of the Australian Broadcasting Commission (1947 to 1958) and vice president of the United Nations Association, NSW.

In support of these interests, Bean wrote to the press, maintained an output of articles (mostly for soldiers' journals), gave lectures and occasional broadcasts.

Underscoring his concern for open spaces and the natural environment, in 1930 he established the Parks and Playgrounds Movement of NSW and became the Movement's honorary secretary. Its aims included the provision of suitable public spaces to enable sports, especially team sports; the preservation of adequate passive recreational spaces and reserves for flora and fauna; ensuring that existing and future parks and reserves were properly used; and maintaining the right of all Australians to enjoy the natural beauties of Australia and of healthy open-air sport and play.

In 1932 Bean persuaded the AWM to buy the Pozieres windmill ruins in France. In July 1916 he had written that the Pozieres ridge "was more densely sown with Australian sacrifice than any other spot on earth". Today the site, a place of pilgrimage, is in the care of the Commonwealth War Graves Commission with a memorial tablet bearing Bean's words.

Bean was an active member of the League of Nations Union, believing in the League as guardian of peace. Horror of war led him to support Chamberlain's conciliation of Hitler in the hope that Hitler would keep his pledges. He retained that hope until the German invasion of Czechoslovakia. On 21 March 1939 in a letter which appeared in the S.M.H under the heading "Recantation", Bean withdrew that support for Chamberlain’s position.

In 1940, with the Second A.I.F. at war, Bean wrote a pamphlet called The Old A.I.F and the New. In that same year he was employed by the Federal Department of Information to provide liaison between the chiefs of staff and the press.

Bean was also involved in the creation of the National Archives of Australia. In 1942 on retiring as Official War Historian of the First World War, he accepted Prime Minister Curtin's invitation to chair what was then known as the War Archives Committee to recommend procedures for the collection and preservation of records created during the Second World War. Bean, along with other historians, had lobbied for this initiative as prior to that time Australia possessed no national archives resulting in World War I records being destroyed. After the war, during Bean's seventeen year chairmanship, the Committee expanded its scope to include all Commonwealth records thereby establishing the foundations for the management of the official records of the Commonwealth of Australia.

In 1943 Bean published War Aims of a Plain Australian. Its message was much the same as that of In Your Hands, Australians: "May we all play the game with larger wisdom than in 1918 and with our whole strength, so as to win not only the war but the peace – this time".

After some unsuccessful lobbying, Bean persuaded the Curtin Government to sponsor a history of the Second World War, recommending the appointment of journalist Gavin Long (son of Bishop Long, above) as official historian. Subsequently, in 1943, Long was appointed general editor of the Official History of Australia in the Second World War, which eventually comprised five series totalling twenty-two volumes of which he, Long, wrote three volumes.

Bean was a member of a committee of twenty-one representative citizens in Sydney, who in 1943, wrote to Prime Minister Curtin commending the Kimberley plan (a Jewish Settlement Proposal in the Kimberley) pointing out that "Australia should acknowledge her increased moral and political responsibilities to the world at large, and extend all possible aid to persecuted peoples." The proposal was ultimately unsuccessful.

In 1944 Bean wrote the "Anzac Requiem" – a short meditation on Australian service and sacrifice in both World War I and the then current World War II. Bean recorded it in August 1946 for radio broadcast on Anzac Day, 25 April 1947, and possibly on subsequent Anzac Days.

In 1946 Bean produced a single-volume history of the Great War, Anzac to Amiens: A Shorter History of the Australian Fighting Services in the First World War. It contained the following statement: "Anzac stood, and still stands, for reckless valour in a good cause, for enterprise, resourcefulness, fidelity, comradeship, and endurance that will never own defeat", thereby outlining what has become known as the Anzac tradition.

In 1948 Bean's Gallipoli Mission was published. It told the story of the visit by the members of the Historical Mission to Gallipoli in 1919. The Mission had retraced the landing and the fight up the range, and with the assistance of a Turkish officer, Major Zeki Bey who served through the campaign, was able to follow the Turk defence system.

In 1950 Bean's commissioned history of the independent corporate schools of Australia was published. The strength of "The Arnold Tradition", as Bean there labelled it, is manifest in it. The title, Here, My Son was derived from Sir Henry Newbolt's poem on the chapel at Clifton, Bean's former school in England.

In 1951 Bean and his wife visited England and when they returned to Australia it was by a migrant ship, on which Bean was employed as a migration officer.

Towards the end of his life Bean planned to write a series of biographies but only one was written: Two Men I Knew: William Bridges and Brudenell White, Founders of the A.I.F., which was published in 1957. It was his last book.

== Honours ==
Bean did not seek personal honours. He declined a knighthood on more than one occasion but accepted other acknowledgments and honours for his work. In 1913 The Royal Society of the Arts awarded him its Silver Medal. He was Mentioned in Despatches (1915). In 1930, the Royal United Services Institute awarded him the Chesney Gold Medal. In the same year the University of Melbourne awarded him its degree of D.Litt. and in 1959 he was awarded an Honorary Doctorate of Laws by the Australian National University, an institution which he had been one of the first to foresee.

== Legacy ==
Bean was admitted to Concord Repatriation Hospital in Sydney in 1964 suffering from dementia and died on 30 August 1968.

=== Military Contribution and Civil Contribution ===
==== Bean's Personal Papers and his Life Story ====
The significance of Bean's papers held by the AWM (and the State Library of NSW) was recognised by their listing on the 2021 UNESCO Memory of the World Programme. The listing citation states, inter alia: "They document his role as one of the founders of the Australian War Memorial and other civic institutions, and are regarded as fundamental to an understanding of critical aspects of Australian identity and commemorative practices." Piggott has referred to the papers as "riches" and in the AWM publication, A guide to the Personal Family and Official papers of CEW Bean, has noted that they occupy 27 metres and document "practically every aspect of his life." Lindsay has recognised the scope and significance of Bean’s papers as providing "a resource for the study of Australian society, not limited to military affairs, during the course of his [Bean's] long life" observing that his "constancy of character, his personal growth in the opinions he held, and his role in shaping national opinion provide a means of calibrating national change."

==== Bean's First World War notebooks, diaries and folders ====
According to the Australian Media Hall of Fame: "It is his [Bean's] extraordinary, painstakingly detailed (and often harrowing) private notes and diaries written during the war that remain one of his greatest achievements." Their significance was recorded in the 2021 UNESCO Memory of the World Register: "The heart of the (Bean) collection is an irreplaceable set of 286 diaries and notebooks that recount Australia's part in the First World War. They describe the activities, conditions and experiences of the Australian Imperial Force (AIF) from the perspective of an eye-witness and a journalist who sought the best possible evidence from a wide range of participants, including enlisted men of all ranks, the military hierarchy and political decision-makers."

==== The Official History of Australia in the War of 1914–1918 ====
The AWM website recognises that Bean’s work on the Official History established the tradition and set the standard for subsequent Australian official war histories and that the work is still used as an essential reference, often as a starting point for research today, because of Bean’s command of the sources and the clarity of his narrative. Bean's history is further described as "notable" because "it was the work of a participant, one who instigated the collection of the archive on which it was based, and was the product of an individual vision of one man who worked with a tiny staff of co-authors and dedicated colleagues".

==== The Australian War Memorial, Canberra. ====
The AWM has been listed on the Australian National Heritage Register. The AWM is unique in that it combines a shrine, museum, and an extensive archive.

==== The Anzac Tradition and Charles Bean's role in the construction of Australia's cultural identity ====
The citation for the listing of Bean’s papers on the 2021 UNESCO Memory of the World Register includes the following: "In his writings and especially in the Australian War Memorial, Bean presented the story of the AIF as a basis for national pride that resonates to this day. Anyone seeking to understand how the newly federated nation of Australia sought to establish its own identity, loyal to Britain but with a distinct national character, must consult these records." In marking the centenary of Federation in 2001 the Sydney Morning Herald published "One Hundred Most Influential Australians of the Century" in which Charles Bean was stated "as probably doing more than anyone to foster a sense of Australian nationhood".

==== The National Archives of Australia ====
The National Archives of Australia for which Bean was a leading advocate contains more than 40 million items, mainly Australian Government records from Federation in 1901 to the present - records about key events and decisions that have shaped Australian history. The collection is considered irreplaceable.

==== Parks and Playgrounds Movement NSW ====
As the founder of this movement, Bean was instrumental in bringing together the early town planning and conservation movements and ensuring the establishment of a network of green spaces throughout the Greater Sydney Region. These green spaces ranged from playgrounds and sporting fields to public gardens and bushland-parks.

== Bibliography ==
- With the flagship in the South (1909)
- On the Wool Track (1910)
- The Dreadnought of the Darling (1911)
- Flagships Three (1913)
- What to Know in Egypt: A Guide for Australian soldiers, (1915)
- The Anzac Book, Written and Illustrated by The Men of Anzac (Ed., 1916)
- Letters from France (1917)
- In Your Hands, Australians, Cassell and Company, London (1918)
- Official History of Australia in the War of 1914–1918

- Volume I – The Story of Anzac: the first phase (1921)
- Volume II – The Story of Anzac: from 4 May 1915 to the evacuation (1924)
- Volume III – The Australian Imperial Force in France: 1916 (1929)
- Volume IV – The Australian Imperial Force in France: 1917 (1933)
- Volume V – The Australian Imperial Force in France: December 1917 – May 1918 (1937)
- Volume VI – The Australian Imperial Force in France: May 1918 – the Armistice (1942)
(A further six volumes were the work of other authors with Bean having varying degrees of involvement)

- War Aims of a Plain Australian (1943)
- Anzac to Amiens (1946)
- Australia's Federal Archives: John Curtin's Initiative (1947)
- Here, My Son, An Account of the Independent and Other Corporate Boys' Schools of Australia (1950)
- Gallipoli Mission (1952)
- Two Men I Knew, William Bridges and Brudenell White, Founders of the A.I.F. (1957)
- A Bibliography of CEW Bean's Major Works, Appendix X, to Be Substantially Great in Thy Self: Getting to Know C. E. W. Bean; Barrister, Judge's Associate, Moral Philosopher (2011)

Copyright in the Official History of Australia in the War of 1914–1918 is held by the Australian War Memorial; copyright in Dr Bean's other works is held by the Bean Family.

== Personal life ==
In St Andrew's Cathedral, Sydney, on 24 January 1921, Bean married Ethel Clara "Effie" Young of Tumbarumba, acting matron at Queanbeyan Hospital during the time Bean worked at Tuggeranong. Officiating at the ceremony was Albert Talbot, the Cathedral's Dean, whom Bean had known as an A.I.F. chaplain. Effie died in Sydney in 1991, aged 97 years. The Beans adopted a daughter, Joyce, who was their only child.

== Eponyms ==
- The Federal Division of Bean in the Australian Capital Territory (ACT) which covers an area in the south of the ACT and also includes Norfolk Island.
- The C. E. W. Bean Foundation established to honour Charles Bean and to commemorate Australian war reporting generally.
- The C. E. W. Bean Building Research Centre at the AWM.
- C. E. W. Bean Prize for Military History awarded annually by the Australian Army to the best honours or postgraduate thesis submitted in any Australian university focusing the history of the Australian Army.
- The Charles Bean Sports Field, in Lindfield in NSW (where Bean and his family lived at one stage) named in recognition of Bean's work with the Parks and Playgrounds Movement in NSW.
- C. E. W. Bean plaque in The Sydney Writers Walk located on the Opera House Walk, East Circular Quay, Sydney.
- C. E. W. Bean plaque in the A.C.T. Honour Walk.
- C. E. W. Bean plaque in the Pillars of Bathurst Commemorative Garden which commemorates past citizens of Bathurst for their services to the Bathurst region and to Australia.
- C. E. W. Bean plaque in Poets Corner of Central Park, Bourke, New South Wales, notes Bean's On the Wool Track and Dreadnought of the Darling.
- C. E. W. Bean Memorial Wall, Bathurst City Library.
- Bean and Long Memorial, Scots All Saints College Bathurst.
- Australia Post's commemoration of Bean in the Centenary of WWI stamp series recognising that Bean 'was a key non-combat figure, who recorded Australia's part in the war and initiated our national military heritage collection.'
- C. E. W. Bean Room in heritage-listed Tuggeranong Homestead, ACT.

== See also ==
- Military attachés and war correspondents in the First World War
