= John Balfour (editor) =

Australian war historian (1892–1976)

John Balfour (24 October 1892 – 10 September 1976) was an Australian war historian. He had a major role in the production of both the Official History of Australia in the War of 1914–1918 and Australia in the War of 1939–1945.

== History ==
Balfour was born in Melbourne, the only son of Robert Balfour (c. 1860 – 8 September 1934) and Maria Balfour, née Whyte, (died January 1955) of "Wattle", 50 Jordan Street, Malvern, Victoria. He was educated at Malvern Primary School, Tooronga Road, Malvern, Victoria and Wesley College, Melbourne. He joined the Department of Defence as a military staff clerk in 1910, working in the Quarter-Master General's branch at Victoria Barracks, Melbourne, then in August 1914, following the outbreak of World War I, volunteered for the First AIF. He left for Alexandria, Egypt and thence to Gallipoli with the rank of staff-sergeant. After evacuation he returned to Egypt, where in 1915 he was promoted to warrant officer, and sent to France in 1916. He fought at Pozières and the Somme, and in December 1916 was transferred to A.I.F. Administrative headquarters in London, where in 1917 he received a commission. He joined the Australian War Records Section in June 1918, serving under J. L. Treloar. Thus began his long career studying the history of Australia's armed forces.

In February–March 1919 Balfour was a member of Charles Bean's three-week "Historical Mission to Gallipoli", sent by London H.Q. to clarify a number of points for his history, inspect war graves, and collect material for future portrayal of events. Their itinerary included a survey of the enemy lines, assisted by a Turkish guide, Major Zeki Bey. The party included photographer Hubert Wilkins, painter George Lambert, Lieutenant Herbert S. Buchanan, in charge of mapping, and a team of surveyors and draftsmen. Arthur Bazley could not be a member of the party, as he was suffering from some kind of infection.

The party returned to Australia in May 1919, and Bean, having been appointed official historian, began working on the first two volumes of Official History of Australia in the War of 1914–1918 at Tuggeranong homestead, near Canberra. Balfour was appointed to his team, tasked with writing biographical notes, compiling indexes and acting as assistant to other writers. They moved to Victoria Barracks, Sydney in 1925. With the History completed in 1942, Balfour briefly served as librarian at the Australian War Memorial (AWM).

Between December 1944 and September 1946, he was attached to MacArthur's South West Pacific Area (SWPA) headquarters, first in Brisbane, then from April 1945 in Manila, processing records relating to AIF operations against Japanese forces. He was one of the few Australians present at the surrender of Japan aboard the USS Missouri in Tokyo Bay on 2 September, 1945. In February 1948 he joined Gavin Long in Canberra, as senior research officer, working on Australia in the War of 1939–1945. He retired in 1957, living quietly at 51 Captain Cook Crescent, Griffith, Australian Capital Territory. He died in Canberra in 1976 and his remains were buried at the Canberra Cemetery.

== Family ==
Balfour married Nellie Doris Fisher (c. 1884 – 27 July 1985) on 10 April 1920. Their children include three sons: Gordon, Bruce and Don, and two daughters: Gwen and Dorothy (Mrs John French).
