= Ernest Corey =

Highly decorated Australian soldier (1891–1972)

Ernest Albert Corey
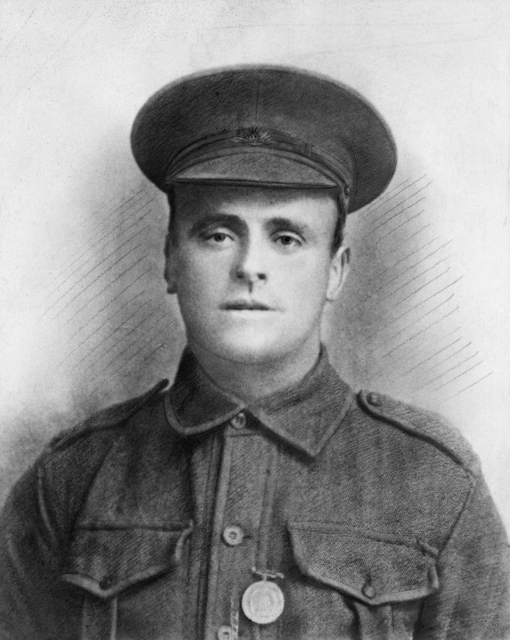
- Ernest Albert Corey c.1916
- Born: 20 December 1891; Numeralla, New South Wales
- Died: 25 August 1972 (aged 80); Canberra, Australian Capital Territory
- Military career
- Allegiance: Australia
- Branch: Australian Imperial Force
- Service years: 1916–1919; 1941–1943
- Rank: Corporal
- Nickname: Ernie
- Units: 55th Battalion (1916–1919); 2nd Garrison Battalion (1941–1943)
- Conflicts: First World War; Western Front; Battle of Fromelles; Battle of the Somme; Battle of Passchendaele; Battle of Arras; Second World War; Home front
- Awards: Military Medal & Three Bars

Ernest Albert Corey, MM & Three Bars (20 December 1891 – 25 August 1972) was a distinguished Australian soldier who served as a stretcher bearer during the First World War. He enlisted in the Australian Imperial Force on 13 January 1916, and was allocated to the 55th Battalion, where he was initially posted to a grenade section before volunteering for stretcher bearing duties. In 1917 he was twice awarded the Military Medal for his devotion to duty in aiding wounded soldiers, and twice again in 1918; becoming the only person to be awarded the Military Medal four times.

Born in New South Wales, Corey was employed as a blacksmith's striker upon leaving school. In January 1916, he became a member of the "Men from Snowy River" recruiting march, enlisting in Goulburn. Returning to Australia after the Armistice, he was discharged on medical grounds in 1919 and was employed in a number of jobs before re-enlisting in a militia battalion for service in the Second World War. He died in 1972 and was buried with full military honours in the Ex-Servicemen's section of Woden Cemetery, Australian Capital Territory.

== Early life ==
Corey was born on 20 December 1891 in Numeralla, New South Wales, the eighth child of Thomas Corey and his wife Ellen, née Burke. He was educated at Thubergal Lake Public School, before leaving to become a blacksmith's striker at Martin's Smithy in Cooma. In January 1916, Corey marched from Cooma to Goulburn as a member of the "Men from Snowy River" recruiting march, and enlisted on 13 January. Along with the majority of other members of the march, he was allotted to the 55th Battalion.

== First World War ==
Following training at Goulburn camp, he embarked for overseas on 4 September aboard HMAT Port Sydney with the 4th Reinforcements for the 55th Battalion. Arriving in England, he spent three months with the 14th Training Battalion at Hurdcott Camp near Fovant in Wiltshire, before joining the 55th Battalion on 8 February 1917 at Montauban, France. Posted to the grenade section of "C" Company, he took part in the capture of Doignies in April.

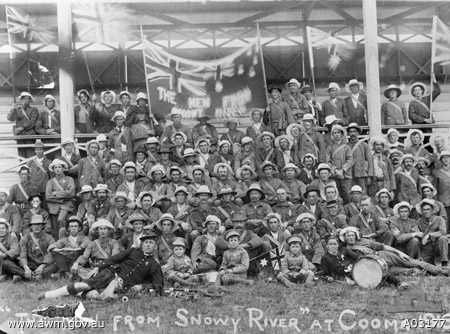
'Men from Snowy River' at Cooma.

On 15 May, Corey's brigade was in action near Quéant. Suffering heavy losses, the commanding officer of the 55th called for volunteers to assist the stretcher bearers; Corey was one of thirty men who volunteered. For seventeen hours, he assisted in carrying the wounded approximately 2 kilometres (1.2 mi) back to the dressing station; he was awarded the Military Medal for this action.

Following engagements at Bullecourt, the 5th Division—of which the 55th Battalion was part—spent four months in reserve, before moving into the Ypres sector in Belgium. Made a regular stretcher bearer, Corey was decorated with a bar to his Military Medal for his actions on 26 September during the Battle of Polygon Wood. While subject to heavy artillery and machine gun fire, he frequently ventured out into no-man's-land to tend to the wounded.

During the winter of 1917–1918, the 55th Battalion was posted to the Messines sector, where Corey was granted leave to the United Kingdom in February 1918. While on leave, he became ill and spent ninety days in hospital before rejoining his battalion in July. Shortly after, the Allies launched an offensive against the Germans in August along the Somme, where the 55th Battalion became involved in the capture of Péronne in September. It was here where Corey received the second bar to his Military Medal; between 1–2 September, while subject to heavy machine gun and artillery fire, he continually assisted the wounded with first aid.

Promoted to corporal on 21 September, he was placed in charge of the battalion's stretcher bearers, whom he led during the battle north of Bellicourt on 30 September. Corey attended to the wounded while exposed to fire, and continued to direct other bearer parties throughout the action until wounded himself, receiving wounds in the right groin and thigh. It was during this engagement that he was awarded a third bar to his Military Medal. He is the only person to have been awarded the Military Medal four times. Evacuated to a casualty station, Corey was operated on before receiving a transfer to a general hospital at Le Havre. Operated on again, he was sent to a hospital in Bristol, England. Repatriated to Australia on 30 April 1919, he was medically discharged in June.

== Later life ==
Returning to Cooma, Corey was employed as a contract rabbiter before moving to Canberra in 1922, where he was employed as a camp caretaker. On 23 September 1924, at St Gregory's Catholic Church, Queanbeyan, he married Sarah Jane Fisher; the pair later had a daughter, Patricia, before the marriage was dissolved in 1935. Between 1927 and 1940, Corey worked for the Department of the Interior as an office cleaner. He re-enlisted for service in the Second World War with the Australian Military Forces on 23 September 1941, and was posted to the 2nd Garrison Battalion for two years before he was medically discharged as a private on 11 October 1943.

He then went through a series of jobs, including employment as a caretaker, a cook for a departmental survey party and as a leading hand at the Canberra incinerator. By 1951 he was almost crippled with osteoarthritis, and soon after was admitted to the Queanbeyan Private Nursing Home, where he died on 25 August 1972; he was buried with full military honours in the Ex-Servicemen's section of Woden Cemetery.

His medals are displayed in the First World War gallery at the Australian War Memorial, and replicas of his medals and copies of the citations for the Military Medal and three bars can be viewed in the Canberra Services Club, of which he was a member for many years.

== Citations ==
Military Medal

The award for Corey's Military Medal was published in a supplement to the London Gazette on 18 July 1917. His citation read:

During the enemy attack on front line facing Queant on 15th May 1917, Pte Corey, whilst acting as a stretcher bearer, showed great courage and devotion to duty. Although under direct enemy observation, he carried out his duties continuously for 17 hours without rest, and in a manner worthy of the highest commendation. Although an untrained stretcher bearer, he, together with the rest of the bearing party saved by first aid the lives of seriously wounded men. The Commander of the 54th Bn wrote an appreciation for the help given, and specially mentioned the stretcher bearing party for their good work.

First Bar to Military Medal

Originally recommended for the Distinguished Conduct Medal, Corey was instead awarded a Bar to his Military Medal. The award was published in a supplement to the London Gazette on 14 January 1918. The citation for his first Bar read:

This stretcher bearer showed great courage, devotion to duty and untiring energy during the attack on Polygon Wood on the 26th September 1917. The greatest danger did not deter this man from doing his duty when his services were required, and he tended the wounded and carried them to places of safety continuously throughout the engagement, often under very heavy artillery and machine gun fire. Throughout the whole operations he set a fine example of bravery and coolness to all ranks.

Second Bar to Military Medal

Corey was again originally recommended for the Distinguished Conduct Medal, but was awarded a second Bar to his Military Medal. The award of the second Bar was published in a supplement to the London Gazette on 13 March 1919. The citation for his second Bar records:

For conspicuous gallantry and devotion to duty during operations at Peronne on 1st and 2nd September 1918. This man who is a stretcher bearer, dressed and carried wounded of several units throughout the whole of the operation. Although the enemy artillery and machine gun fire was exceptionally heavy, this did not debar this man from carrying on. He worked continuously and arduously and was the means of saving the lives of many of the wounded. He was most unselfish throughout and cheerful at all times and under all circumstances. His careful handling of the wounded and his knowledge of first aid helped greatly to relieve their sufferings; throughout the operations he set a fine example of courage, coolness, determination and devotion to duty, under heavy fire.

Third Bar to Military Medal

The third Bar to his Military Medal was published in a supplement to the London Gazette on 13 June 1919. The citation for his third bar records:

For conspicuous gallantry and devotion to duty as NCO in charge of Battalion stretcher bearers during an attack on the Hindenburg Line north of Bellicourt on 30 September 1918. Although enemy machine gun and shell fire were intense, this gallant NCO directed the operations of the Battalion stretcher bearers with the utmost skill and bravery. Regardless of personal danger, he, on numerous occasions although the enemy were firing upon him and other bearer parties, attended to men and carried them from the most exposed positions. His efforts were untiring and he set a splendid example to all ranks until he was severely wounded. It was mainly due to his magnificent work that the wounded were safely removed from the danger zone.

== Memorial ==
Following several donations by the people of Cooma and the Monaro District, a Memorial Plaque to Corey was erected in Centennial Park, Cooma in 1979. In 1995, the plaque was moved to the Cooma Memorial and the committee involved with the relocation decided to erect a diorama based on a painting in the Australian War Memorial depicting stretcher bearers bringing in wounded soldiers under heavy shell fire at Mont St Quentin during the First World War. A local artist and sculptor, Chris Graham, was commissioned to undertake the project which was constructed from steel and concrete. It was erected in the Cooma War Memorial area on 23 April 1996.

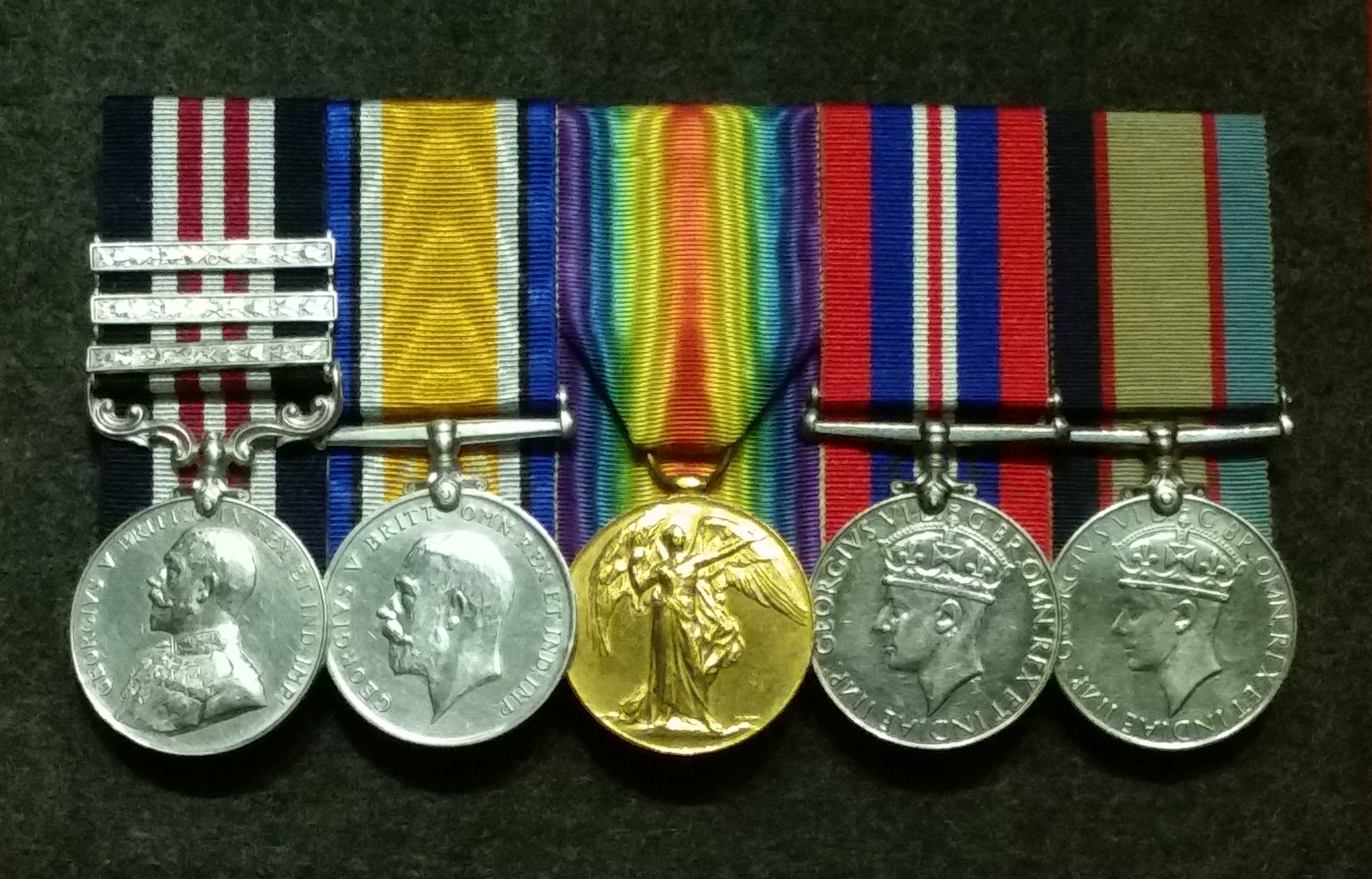
Ernest Corey's medals on display at the Australian War Memorial, Canberra.

The inscription on the memorial reads:

IN HONOUR OF
2143 CORPORAL
ERNEST ALBERT COREY
MILITARY MEDAL AND 3 BARS
55TH AUSTRALIAN INFANTRY BATTALION
1ST A.I.F.
A MEMBER OF THE MEN FROM
SNOWY RIVER MARCH DELEGATE TO
GOULBURN
THE ONLY SOLDIER EVER TO HAVE
BEEN AWARDED A
MILITARY MEDAL AND 3 BARS
1891–1972
ERECTED BY THE CITIZENS OF MONARO 1979
