= Arthur Bazley =

Arthur William Bazley (4 August 1896 – 31 July 1972) was an Australian soldier who served as batman and unofficial secretary to military historian Charles Bean throughout the First World War and beyond as a research assistant. He was director of the Australian War Memorial in its early years, and was of great service to Bean in the compilation of his Official History of Australia in the War of 1914–1918. In his later career he was a trusted public servant.

== History ==
Bazley was born at South Yarra, Victoria, son of Georgina Victoria Bazley, née Gibson (1873–1955), and Arthur Edwin Bazley (1864–1939), of 9 Moffatt Street, South Yarra, a principal of Broadbent & Bazley, coachbuilders of Toorak Road, South Yarra. He was educated at South Yarra (Punt Road) State School, and found employment as a clerk with Melbourne's Argus newspaper.

He had three years' experience with the Senior Cadets (Note: Perhaps 'H' Company, Prahran detachment, Senior Cadet Battalion, which met at the Orderly Rooms, at the corner of Punt and Commercial roads, Prahran.) and three months in the militia — with the 19th Battery (St Kilda), 7th Field Artillery Brigade — when he enlisted with the First AIF, assigned to Headquarters, on 5 October 1914. He gave his age as 19 though he was barely 18, so he could sail on the RMS Orvieto in the first convoy to Egypt on 21 October 1914. One account has him already attached as an assistant to Charles Bean. This may be so as Bean, though technically a civilian, was entitled to a driver and a batman, however Bazley was not formally appointed batman until 11 April 1916.

Bean was at Gallipoli from 25 April 1915, some hours after the first landing, and was one of the last to leave, on the night of 17 December 1915, in the meantime recording what he saw of the conflict in official memos and his own notebooks, and sending reports to the various news agencies. Bazley served as clerk and typist; he made many trips between Anzac Cove and the base at Imbros. A third member of Bean's party was Walter Dexter, about whom little has been written. Later that year Bean solicited from the Australian soldiers contributions for what would be an end-of-year magazine, but the evacuation interceded, and the 150-odd poems, essays and drawings were taken by Bazley to Imbros base on the 16 December. Bazley left for London on 22 January 1916, and helped edit those contributions, plus some of Bean's photographs and poems 'Abdul' and 'Non Nobis', into what became The Anzac Book, published May 1916.

Much of the next three years was spent with the Australian War Records Section in London, reporting, collecting, collating and publishing. He accompanied Bean on several expeditions to Belgium and France, where they experienced trench warfare at Fleurbaix, Pozières, Bullecourt and Arras, Messines, Passchendaele, Villers-Bretonneux and elsewhere. Bazley was promoted to corporal in August 1917 and sergeant in February 1918 and staff sergeant in November 1918.. Bean gained another assistant in John Balfour in June 1918.

Bazley returned to Melbourne with Bean and the Australian troops on the transport Kildonan Castle in May 1919. He was de-mobilized in June 1919 and re-employed, with the pay grade of staff-sergeant, from that date.

For the next 20 years he assisted Bean in compiling his history of the war, working on the first two volumes (Note: This would have been Volumes 1 and 12 (photographs) — their order of completion was 1, 12, 7, 8, 2, 3, 10, 9, 11, 5, 6. No mention of Vol. 4.) at the Tuggeranong homestead, near Canberra, and from 1925 at the Victoria Barracks, Sydney.

In 1940 he was appointed chief clerk and librarian of the about-to-be-opened Australian War Memorial, Canberra. In 1942 he became acting director, with the added responsibility of appointing official war artists. He supervised the production and distribution of the World War II documentary film Sons of the Anzacs, and organised a travelling exhibition of Australian war paintings and photographs. He was appointed to what became the Commonwealth Archives Committee, serving until 1960, when its functions were taken over by the Commonwealth Archives Office, later National Archives of Australia.

In 1946 he joined the Department of Immigration, with the responsibility of assessing on a case-by-case basis the liability for deportation of persons who had been interned during the war years, and from 1948 to 1951 was secretary of the Commonwealth Immigration Advisory Council, responsible for advising the Minister for Immigration on policy matters. In 1951 he was appointed chairman of a committee advising the Minister (Arthur Calwell) on the settlement of claims for compensation, under the Temple Society Trust Fund Act 1949, by Templars in Australia whose property was confiscated by the Israeli Government in 1948.

In 1955 Bazley was tasked to implement "Operation Reunion", a policy initiated by Calwell but implemented under Harold Holt and his successors Athol Townley and Alick Downer, to facilitate immigration of WWII refugees from the Baltic States who had relatives in Australia. Within five years about 10,000 wives, husbands, children, brothers and sisters were reunited, largely through Bazley's work.

He retired from the Commonwealth Public Service in 1961.

In 1968 he was one of a group who, following Canberra's Anzac Day march, were entertained by the Turkish ambassador, B. V. Karatay, the first such occasion.

== Other interests ==
In 1930 Bazley became a volunteer co-editor of the army magazine Reveille, and contributed biographies on prominent A.I.F. personnel, which have been praised for their lucid accuracy. When that magazine folded in 1940 he founded and edited the journal Stand To for the A.C.T. branch of the Returned Sailors', Soldiers' and Airmen's Imperial League of Australia (later Returned and Services League — R.S.L.). Stand To folded in 1957, on account of increasing costs. From 1957, again voluntarily, he supplied material for the Dictionary of National Biography. Although he had no academic qualifications, his work was that of a great scholar, and his opinion was eagerly sought.

== Works ==
- Arthur Bazley (31 August 1968). "Charles Bean, Chronicler of Australia at War". The Canberra Times. Vol. 42, no. 12, 094. Australian Capital Territory, Australia. p. 2 – via National Library of Australia.

== Recognition ==
- In 1955 he was granted life membership by the R.S.L.
- Bazley Street, Fraser, Australian Capital Territory, 35.1926°S 149.0535°E was named for him.

== See also ==
Bean had another assistant, John Balfour, who later worked for Gavin Long, compiling Australia in the War of 1939–1945.

== Family ==
While in England Bazley became engaged to Anne Celia "Wendy" Chalk (c. 1896 – 2 December 1941); they married in Melbourne on 1 October 1919. They had three children:

- Wendy Hilda Bazley (1921–1999)
- Peter Edwin Bazley (23 February 1925 – 21 November 2017) served in Royal Australian Navy in WWII.
- Patricia ("Pat") Bazley was a Canberra nurse

He married again, in Sydney, to divorcee Mary Scott, née McPhee (1908–1973), on 16 April 1949. They had a home at Elimatta Street, Reid, where he died, aged 75.
