= In Your Hands, Australians =

Book by C. E. W. Bean

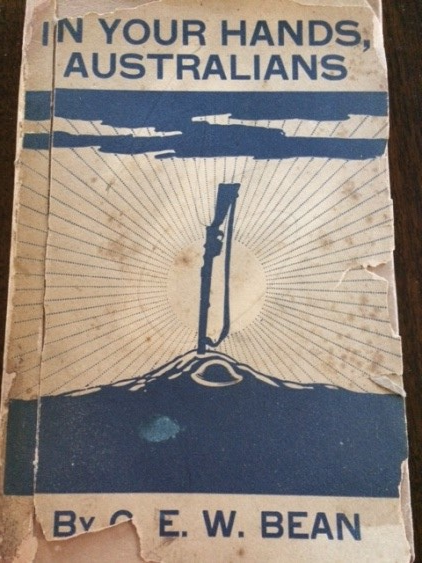
- Author: C. E. W. Bean
- Language: English
- Publication date: November 1918

In Your Hands, Australians is a small book about post-war reconstruction in which Australia’s Official World War 1 Correspondent, C.E.W. Bean exhorted Australians to pursue the aims of peace with the dedication, organisation and tenacity with which they had fought what was then known as the Great War.

== Author ==
Charles Bean was a noted journalist, special correspondent, leader-writer with the Sydney Morning Herald and published author before his appointment in 1914 as Australia’s Official World War 1 Correspondent.

As the Official War correspondent, Bean's works included an outpouring of dispatches, war reports cables, papers, correspondence, and records of interviews with the men of the AIF, and detailed entries in his more than 220 war time diaries.

During the war Bean wrote What to Know in Egypt A Guide for Australian Soldiers (Cairo 1915), and he was associated with three official publications: The Anzac Book (London 1916); From the Australian Front (London 1917) and the miniature newspaper, The Rising Sun. In 1917 he reworked and published a selection of his dispatches as a book entitled Letters from France, (London, 1917.) Bean’s proceeds from his war-time books were donated to the A.I.F. rehabilitation and patriotic funds.

At the conclusion of the war, Bean left London in early January 1919 returning to Australia via Gallipoli where he led the Historical Mission which recorded and reported on the findings of the Mission’s on-site research of the 1915 campaign.

On arrival back in Australia in May 1919, Bean’s recommendation for the writing of an official history was accepted by the Australian Government. His aim with the Official History of Australia in the War of 1914–1918 was to create a perpetual memorial to the A.I.F and to ‘crystallise for all time’ the war's revelation of Australian character. Bean was animated by a guiding principle: that the history was to be a memorial to those who had served, suffered and died.

Bean’s recommendation for the establishment of a national war memorial that ‘for all time … [would] hold the sacred memories of the A.I.F.’ was also accepted. On 11 November 1941, just before the final volume of the official history was published, Bean witnessed the opening of the Australian War Memorial.

During his life Bean was active both in prose and person in a wide variety of civic and war-related works, causes and organisations. Most reflected his concern to improve Australian society and the welfare of its people. Others were linked with his wartime and pre-war occupations. He was a man who was full of ideas and opinions, and who had a vision for Australia.

== The Book ==
=== Description and contents ===
Written in October 1918, during the closing days of the war, Charles Bean called In Your Hands, Australians ‘the little Book on reconstruction’. It was first published in November 1918 shortly after its completion. It has been variously described as a ‘monograph’, a ‘manifesto’, a war-driven homily to young Australia and a secular sermon. It bore the character of a personal letter to all Australians, urging the nation to embrace social improvement following the Great War. There is no particular literary quality in the book – nor would its author have claimed any.

Out of the tragedy he was determined to see a new beginning for a nation that he believed had come of age and made its reputation in the family of nations.

The design on the cover is a pictorial out-line of the book itself. In the foreground is a mound, a grave, with a steel helmet and a reversed rifle on it, indicating the work done by the A.I.F. for Australia; in the back-ground, the rising sun, telling of the rising hope of future achievements for the land under this emblem.

In the Introduction to In Your Hands, Australians (dated November 1918) Bean explained the purpose of the book:

‘We have done with the Great War. We are facing peace. This small book has been written to help the men of the A.I.F. and the young people of Australia, in the trying period after the war, to fill their spare time with a thought or two of what we can all do for Australia in the long peace which many who will not return have helped to win. One does not need to enlarge upon Australia – that word alone means too much to us now to call for a single sentence of mine to expand it. But what we can do for her may at least be the theme for thousands of debating societies here [on the battlefields of Europe] and in Australia. If these few pages assist young Australians to think how they can help Australia themselves in any capacity, the purpose for which they were penned is more than served. Any author’s profit from this book is devoted to funds of the A.I.F.’[27]

Bean had previously written in his war diary on 24 October 1918 that he wanted ‘to shoot in the idea of how the children of the country can take up the work of the AIF for Australia – make their country and not themselves their life’s work.’ The tone of the whole book is set out in ‘Legacy,‘ the first chapter’s opening paragraph, in which Bean wrote of the great work of the A.I.F., and especially of those who made the supreme sacrifice as the legacy left to Australia.

‘They gave it into your hands, Australians, when the bullet took them. It lies in your hands now-you, the younger generation Australia; you, the men of the A.I.F., most of whom are still young Australians; even to the young Australians still at school. Australia lies in your hands now, where those men dying, laid her. This is not mere fancy-it is the simple, splendid truth. You have a much bigger task facing you than the A.I.F. in France and at Anzac had. It is the same great task really; but the A.I.F. only began it.’[30]

Later in this same chapter Bean also wrote: ‘It is the loss of those men, beyond all question, that is Australia’s loss in this war. The money. – the material – is nothing. With a trifling effort we can replace all that – if we did not we should scarcely miss it. But we can never bring back those 60,000 men.”

Altogether the Book contains 16 chapters entitled, respectively: (1) The Legacy; (2) Under Which Flag?; (3) The League of Nations; (4) The Towns; (5) On starting a Progress Association; (6) The Use of Brain; (7) Foreign Policy; (8) New Zealand, Britain, America and Canada; (9) Defence; (10) Population; (11) The Country District; (12) The Country Town; (13) The Great Cities; (14) Who can best make our city laws?; (15) The Laboratories that we need; and (16) Education.

In these chapters Bean expressed in an Australian accent the hope which filled the minds of many good men at the end of 1918: that the world might now have a peace in which the lessons of war would be applied to building: in which the comradeship of armies would be preserved and widened in civil communities; in which the living performed deeds which somehow justified the years of death. The last and longest chapter was about education.

“In education the author argued for a more complete education, in which every part of the boy will be educated, i.e., body, mind, and character. He placed the home pre-eminent as the builder of character. ….The home is to be planned to keep our young Australians possessed of these three characteristics – freshness, decision, enthusiasm. Our schools can do their work by adding an all-important quality to their character – public spirit. Bean wanted to see a system of education that would give to every child an equal (positive active encouragement) to develop every ounce of brain power, physical strength, and manly or womanly character that is in them ‘The teachers must be chosen not so much for what they know, as for what they are.’ “[34]

Bean concluded the book with: ‘Sixty thousand young Australians, who left Australia in high hopes to fight for her, sixty thousand who will never return to her dear shores, have preserved that power to us. We can make her what we will. It is in your hands, Australians.’

Considered as an Australian version of the world-wide hope that the survivors of war would perform peaceful deeds which justified the years of death, In Your Hands, Australians was republished in 1919.

The significance to Bean of In Your Hands, Australians can be ascertained from the timing and circumstances of its writing and the urgency he applied to its publication. Bean decided to use his leave in October 1918 to write the book on reconstruction and to see that it was published, a month later, before the departure of the troops for Australia.

In Bean’s words: "Late in 1918, when news came that the Germans were asking President Woodrow Wilson to arrange an armistice the author (Charles Bean) seized the respite for a fortnight’s leave in the south of France where he spent his holiday in writing for Australian soldiers and the youth of Australia 'a little book about the problems of Australia’s future' which he wanted to publish before the troops left for Australia." "This book was written during the only real 'holiday' leave that I had during the war (except for a couple of days at Oxford in 1916). … I got away for a fortnight to a quiet hotel at Cannes, where I had time to put down many of the thoughts about Australia that had been exercising one's mind during the war years."

Further evidence of its significance to Bean is provided by the fact that he finished the book in late October/November 1918 on his return to Paris from where he continued to visit battalions and drive to Battlefields to obtain photos before they altered. He visited Fromelles on 11 November 1918, Armistice Day. Realising the significance of this tragic 1916 battle to the young Australian nation, Bean walked over the ground to think, reflect and record. In this Bean revealed much of himself: his dedication to these men, their legacy and their role in shaping our nation's emerging identity.

In Your Hands, Australians further illustrated Bean’s’ dedication to these men, their legacy and their role in shaping Australia’s emerging identity.

In the tract Bean urged the creation of an "Anglo-Saxon nation of free, happy, brilliant people". At the time of writing it, Bean was a proponent of the White Australia ideology which Rees has noted, he [Bean] would revisit and re-evaluate over the years ahead. Inglis also noted that "The sense of values established in [Bean’s] boyhood remained constant; some of the opinions he derived from it were still changing. Before 1914 he had employed serenely the notion of an English race, and briskly defended White Australia.…By 1949 he was arguing for admission of limited numbers of immigrants from Asia rather than perpetrating a ‘quite senseless colour line.’”. In his essay “Racism in Australia – A Contribution to the Debate” Ellis has charted Bean’s shift from support for a “White Australia” before World War 1 to a multi racial immigration policy after experience of two World Wars and the horror of Nazi racialism. Bean also envisaged a future Australia as being an agrarian society with millions of farms which thinking was, according to Bolleter, “in the ascendent until the mid-twentieth century and beyond.”Aboriginal Australians are not mentioned in his vision and are not mentioned or referred to by Bean in his text, but neither are they necessarily excluded from his vision or the text. There are many instances in the tract where Bean uses inclusive language such as: “…the making of a nation is in the hands of every man and woman, every boy and girl,” and "We must plan for the education of every person in the State in body, mind and character."

As he anticipated the end of World War II Charles Bean published a second monograph. As with In Your Hands, Australians, the second monograph, War Aims of a Plain Australian, bore the character of a personal letter to all Australians, urging the nation to embrace social improvement. It was published in 1943 and republished in 1945.

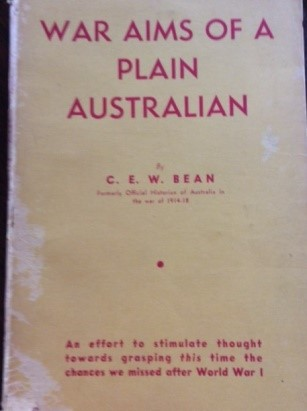

“He (Bean) has a warm belief in his country and in its people, and has tried in this book to express constructively, avoiding cynicism, the hopes of ‘plain Australians’ for the future of their nation and the world… "

Bean described this book as ‘An effort to stimulate thought towards grasping this time the chances we missed after World War 1’.

‘The ball will be at our feet within a year or two. Surely it is high time that we give serious thought as to what we should do with it. The object of this little book is to help that thought; to direct some readers, perhaps, to points that must be considered, and, together with essays of the same kind by other pens, to give impetus to further thought and discussion. May we all play the game with larger wisdom than in 1918 and with our whole strength, so as to win not only the war but the peace – This time.’[52]

Of his books, both these short books, In Your Hands, Australians and War Aims of a Plain Australian have been considered as perhaps the most revealing of Bean’s character as a “social missionary.

== Critical reception ==
In Your Hands, Australians was met with favorable criticism:

“In his recently- published book In Your Hands, Australians, Bean preaches high ideals- for the days of peace, and proves himself a good Australian, filled with patriotic fervour, animated by deep love of his native land. He has learnt, as did every "Digger," that there is no country like his own, and no people the equal of his compatriots.”

“A Fine Book – For Australians."

“....an inspiring book, In Your Hands, Australians is a book which must be read by every citizen of the Commonwealth.”

“This book is one of the freshest and most suggestive that we have read on the great problems of reconstruction. It is well worth reading with care and thought. The writer speaks from a privileged position. It is evident that this high tone is necessary to pull the country through the trying times.”
