= Vietnam Combat Artists Program =

U.S. Army program for artists during the Vietnam War

U.S. Army Vietnam Combat Artists Program
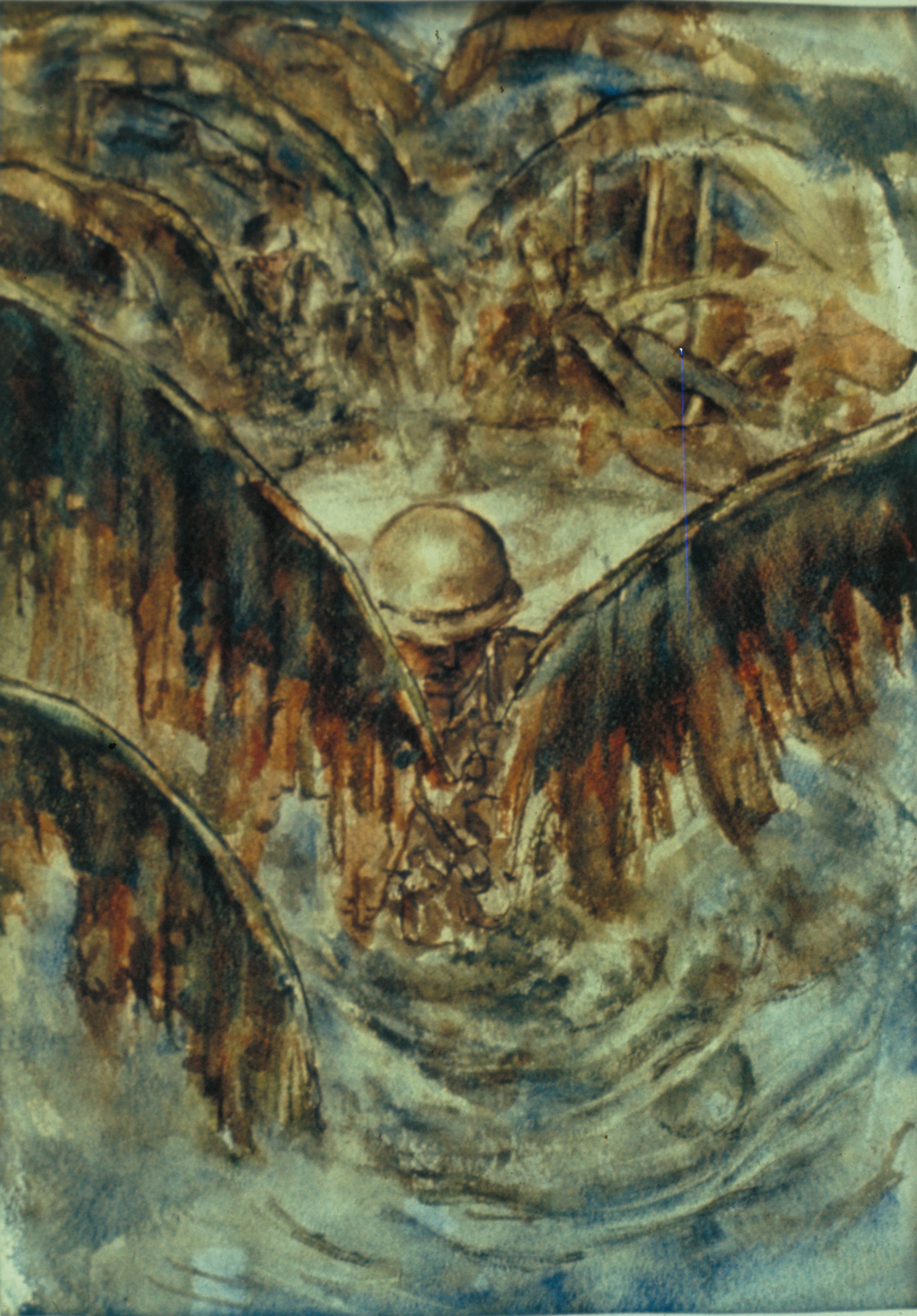
- LOOKING DOWN THE TRAIL Watercolor James Pollock, CAT IV, 1967 Courtesy of the National Museum of the U.S. Army
- Active: (June 1966–1970)
- Country: United States of America
- Allegiance: United States of America
- Branch: United States Army

In June 1966, the Army Vietnam Combat Artists Program was established as part of the United States Army Art Program, utilizing teams of soldier-artists to make pictorial records of U.S. Army activities in the course of the Vietnam War for the annals of military history. The concept of the Vietnam Combat Art Program had its roots in World War II when the U.S. Congress authorized the Army to use soldier-artists to record military operations in 1944.

During the Vietnam Era, the U.S. Army Chief of Military History asked Marian McNaughton, then Curator for the Army Art Collection, to develop a plan for a Vietnam soldier art program. The result was the creation in 1966 of the U. S. Army Vietnam Combat Art Program under the direction of the Office of Chief of Military History and McNaughton's office. Her plan included involving the U.S. Army Arts and Crafts Program, then headed by Eugenia Nowlin. McNaughton's office relied on Nowlin and her cadre of local Army Arts and Crafts directors to solicit applications from soldiers, which were forwarded to McNaughton's office at the U.S. Army Center of Military History, where selection and team assignments were made. The U.S. Army provided logistics support as the teams of artists were sent to Vietnam and then to Hawaii.

Artists interested in joining the program were asked to submit applications through the Army Arts and Crafts Program facilities nearest their unit. Applications were to contain samples of drawings, photographs of paintings and a resume. Selections were made by a committee composed of designated representatives from the Office, Chief of Military History and the Adjutant General's Office. Supervised by Army Art Curator Marian McNaughton. The program was the joint responsibility of the Office, Chief of Military History, and the Adjutant General's Office with support from the Office, Chief of information.

== History ==
Nine Combat Artist Teams (CATs) operated in Vietnam. Typically, each team consisted of five soldier artists who spent 60 days of temporary duty (TDY) in Vietnam gathering information and making preliminary sketches of U.S. Army related activities. The teams then transferred to Hawaii for an additional 75 days to finish their work. Artists were given artistic freedom and encouraged to depict subjects in their own individual styles. Art created by soldier artists became a part of the U.S. Army Art Collection maintained by the U.S. Army Center of Military History (CMH), Washington, D.C.

On 17 March 1969, due to the widespread interest shown by soldier artists and the impact of their work throughout the Army, the official name was changed from the VIETNAM COMBAT ART PROGRAM to the ARMY ARTIST PROGRAM. Coverage was expanded to include portraying the U.S. Army worldwide.

=== U.S. Army soldier artist participants ===
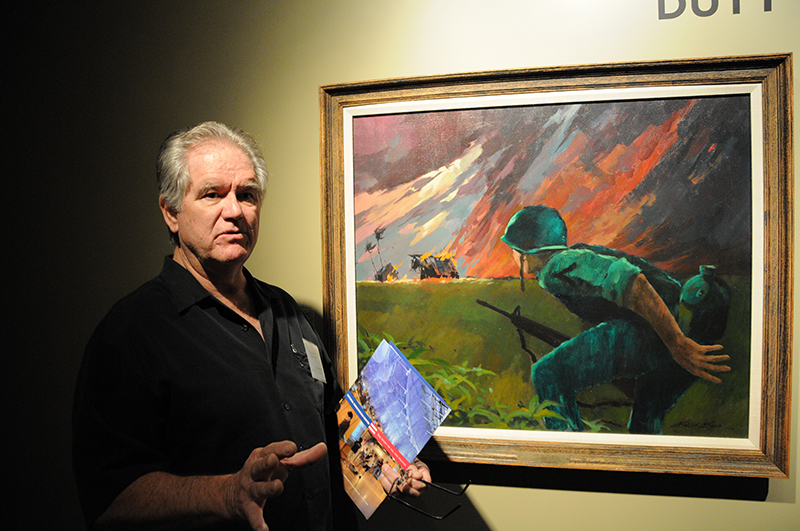
Roger Blum, Vietnam Combat Artist Team I, discusses his painting "Attack at Twilight," completed with acrylic. The painting was inspired by Blum's first view of a burning "hooch," or hut, and he used dramatic lighting to emphasize the emotion of the painting.

List of U.S. Army Vietnam Combat Artist Team (CAT) members and supervisors from 15 August 1966 – 14 January 1970. (Cities listed reflect information on original applications which are currently in archives of U.S. Army Center of Military History).

- CAT I, 15 Aug - 15 Dec 1966, Roger A. Blum (Stillwell, KS), Robert C. Knight (Newark, NJ), Ronald E. Pepin (East Hartford, CT), Paul Rickert (Philadelphia, PA), Felix R. Sanchez (Fort Madison, IA), John O. Wehrle (Dallas, TX), and supervisor, Frank M. Sherman.
- CAT II, 15 Oct 1966 – 15 Feb 1967, Augustine G. Acuna (Monterey, CA), Alexander A. Bogdanovich (Chicago, IL), Theodore E. Drendel (Naperville, IL), David M. Lavender (Houston, TX), Gary W. Porter (El Cajon, CA), and supervisor, Carolyn M. O'Brien.
- CAT III, 16 Feb - 17 June 1967, Michael R. Crook (Sierra Madre, CA), Dennis O. McGee (Castro Valley, CA), Robert T. Myers (White Sands Missile Range, NM), Kenneth J. Scowcroft (Manassas, VA), Stephen H. Sheldon (Los Angeles, CA), and supervisor, C. Bruce Smyser.
- CAT IV, 15 Aug - 31 Dec 1967, Samuel E. Alexander (Philadelphia, MS), Daniel T. Lopez (Fresno, CA), Burdell Moody (Mesa, AZ), James R. Pollock (Pollock, SD), Ronald A. Wilson (Lakewood, CA), and technical supervisor, Frank M. Thomas.
- CAT V, 1 Nov 1967 – 15 March 1968, Warren W. Buchanan (Kansas City, MO), Philip V. Garner (Dearborn, MI), Phillip W. Jones (Greensboro, NC), Don R. Schol (Denton, TX), John R. Strong (Kanehoe, HI), and technical supervisor, Frank M. Thomas.
- CAT VI, 1 Feb - 15 June 1968, Robert T. Coleman (Grand Rapids, MI), David N. Fairrington (Oakland, CA), John D. Kurtz IV (Wilmington, DE), Kenneth T. McDaniel (Paris, TN), Michael P. Pala (Bridgeport, CT).
- CAT VII, 15 Aug - 31 Dec 1968, Brian H. Clark (Huntington, NY), William E. Flaherty Jr. (Louisville, KY), William C. Harrington (Terre Haute, IN), Barry W. Johnston (Huntsville, AL), Stephen H. Randall (Des Moines, IA), and supervisor, Fitzallen N. Yow.
- CAT VIII, 1 Feb - 15 June 1969, Edward J. Bowen (Corona Del Mar, CA), James R. Drake (Colorado Springs, CO), Roman Rakowsky (Cleveland, OH), Victory V. Reynolds (Idaho Falls, ID), Thomas B. Schubert (Chicago, IL), and supervisor, Fred B. Engel.
- CAT IX, 1 Sept 1969 - 14 Jan 1970, David E. Graves (Lawrence, KS), James S. Hardy (Coronado, CA), William R. Hoettels (San Antonio, TX), Bruce N. Rigby (Dekalb, IL), Craig L. Stewart (Laurel, MD), and supervisor, Edward C. Williams.

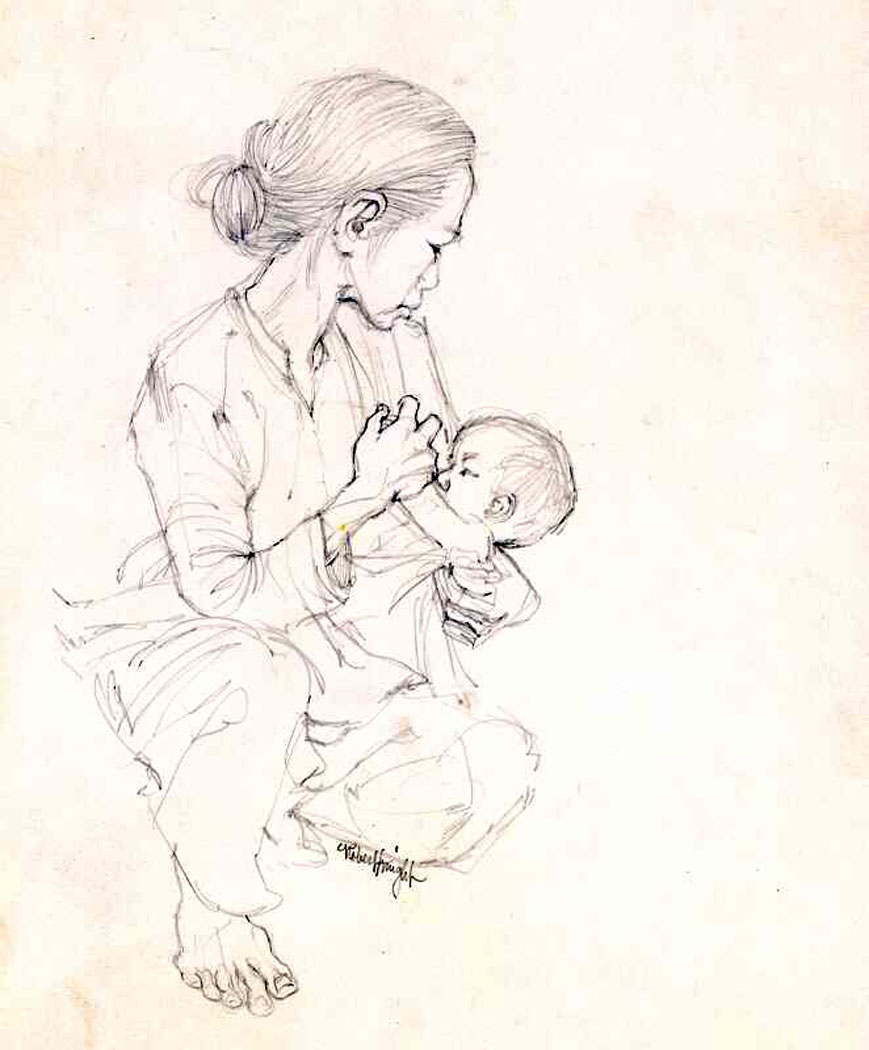
NURSING by Robert C. Knight, CAT I, 1966, Courtesy of the National Museum of the U.S. Army

James Pollock, who in 1967 served as a soldier artist on U. S. Army Vietnam Combat Artist Team IV (CAT IV), chronicled his experience in an essay entitled "US Army Soldier-Artists in Vietnam" for "War, Literature & the Arts: An International Journal of the Humanities" published by the department of English and Fine Arts, United States Air Force Academy. In the essay Pollock wrote: "The idea of rotating teams of young soldier-artists from a variety of backgrounds and experiences through Vietnam was innovative. Soldier-artists were encouraged to freely express and interpret their individual experience in their own distinct styles. The artists responded enthusiastically to their artistic free reign [sic], and the resulting products were wide-ranging and comprehensive. Styles and media used were as diverse as the artists themselves, some chose detailed literal images while others preferred expressive almost abstract explosions striving to replicate the horrors of war".

== Army artists after Vietnam ==
During the Vietnam War the army art program also used civilian artists. While the last team of soldier artists in Vietnam was Soldier Art Team 9 (CAT IX) the Army's interest in using artists to depict army activities continued. The 1991 book "Portrait of an Army", published by U. S. Army Center of Military History and edited by General Gordon R. Sullivan and Marylou Gjernes, states "Following the Vietnam War, the Army continued to use both soldier and civilian artists. They have covered such peacetime activities as summer training for Reserve Officers' Training Corps (ROTC) West Point cadets, Army National Guard annual training, and tank gunnery training in Europe. The Army Art Collection has also acquired depictions of the Army's operations in Panama and Operations DESERT SHIELD and DESERT STORM."

In 2003, former Vietnam soldier-artist James Pollock gave a presentation entitled "U. S. Army Vietnam Combat Art Program" about Vietnam Era soldier artists at Mary Pickford Theater, U. S. Library of Congress at which he said: "On January 14, 1970, the members of Vietnam Combat Art Team IX (CAT IX), the last U.S. Army art team to set foot in Vietnam, disbanded. Like members of eight other Army soldier-artist teams before them, they left their sketchbooks and paintings of war-torn Vietnam behind and quietly returned to their respective military units scattered throughout the world or were re-assigned. Talent and chance had brought 46 young soldiers together for a common purpose: To be artists day in and day out for 120 days and to translate their personal Vietnam experiences as soldiers into art. All of the artists were exposed to the inherent dangers of being in a war zone. While visiting units in the fields of Vietnam, they encountered difficult conditions and some had to deal with life-threatening incidents. None were wounded or killed. The post-Vietnam Era destiny of these soldier artists varied as they went on to establish and nurture families and careers. Some continued successfully as artists, some became art teachers, some laid down their paint brushes and found careers outside the field of art. Some have died, and the whereabouts of others is unknown".

== Public showings ==
From September 2010 to March 2011, the National Constitution Center in Philadelphia, PA hosted an exhibit entitled "Art of the American Soldier" featuring more than 300 works from the army art collection, one of the first times that the Army Art from the Army Art Program has been put on display en masse.

In June 2015, South Dakota Public Broadcasting interviewed combat artist James Pollock about his experiences in the Vietnam Combat Art Program.

In September 2017, South Dakota Public Broadcasting produced a video about the Vietnam Combat Artists Program entitled "The Art of War" as part of their SD Vietnam Stories project produced to accompany the broadcast of Ken Burns' "The Vietnam War" series.

== See also ==
- United States Army Art Program
- United States Air Force Art Program
- American official war artists

== Art Gallery (All Images Courtesy of the National Museum of the U.S. Army) ==
=== CAT I 15 August to 15 December 1966 ===
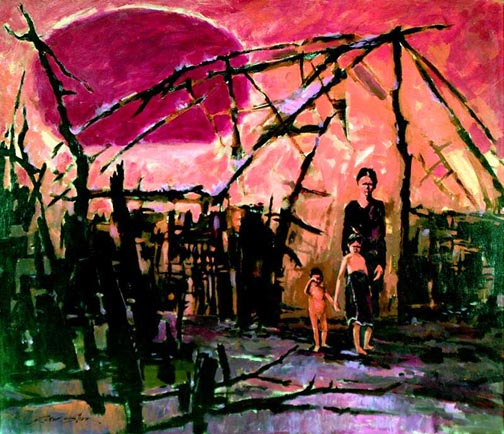
THE LOST OF WAR by Roger A. Blum, CAT I, 1966

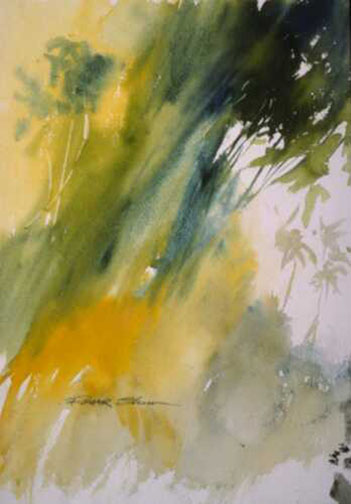
ELEPHANT GRASS by Roger A. Blum, CAT I, 1966

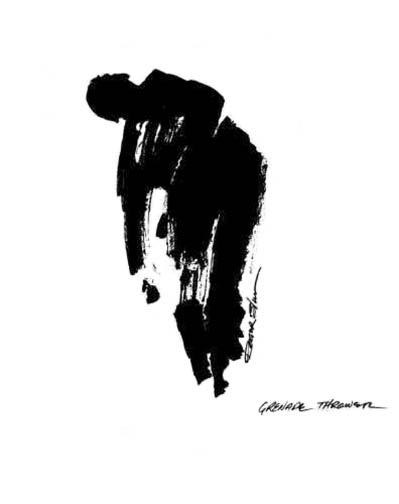
GRENADE THROWER by Roger Blum, CAT I, 1966

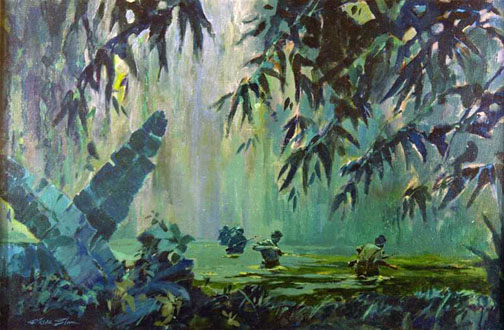
SWAMP PATROL by Roger Blum, CAT I, 1966

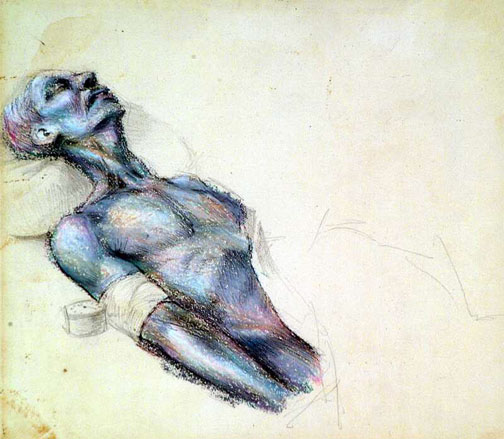
WOUNDED by Robert C. Knight, CAT I, 1966

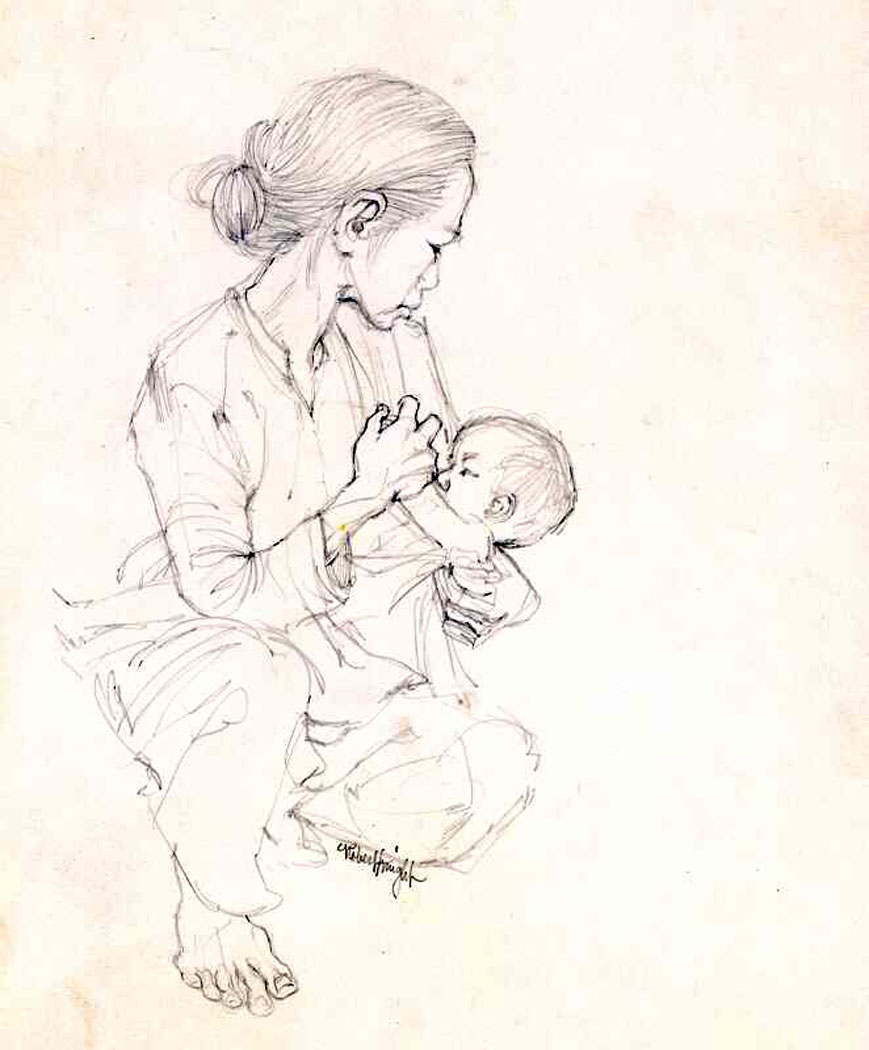
NURSING by Robert C. Knight, CAT I, 1966

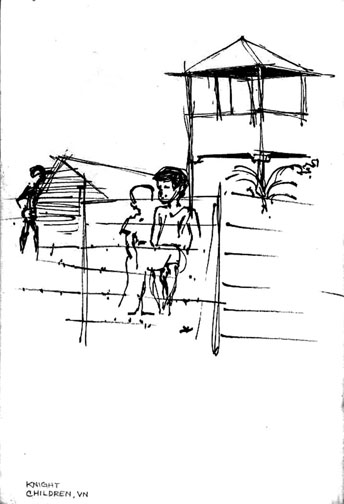
PAGE FROM SKETCHBOOK by Robert C. Knight, CAT I, 1966

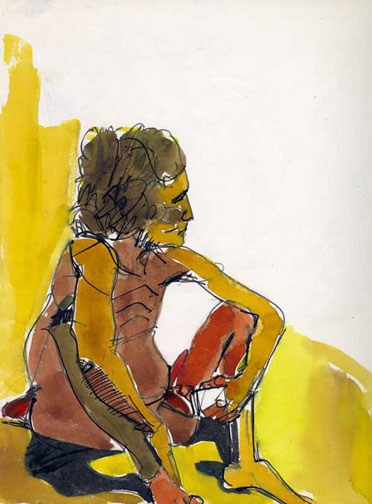
VIETNAMESE WOMAN by Paul Rickert, CAT I, 1966

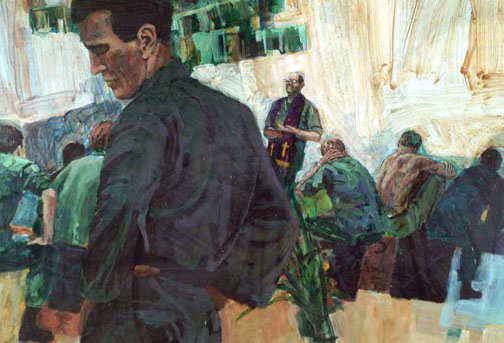
RELIGIOUS SERVICES 1st CAV AKA THY ROD and THY STAFF, THEY COMFORT ME by Paul Rickert, CAT I, 1966

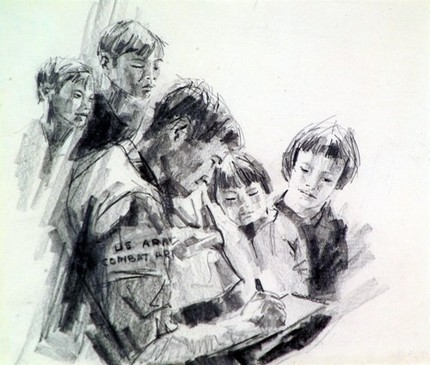
Combat Artist At Work by Paul Rickert, CAT I, 1966

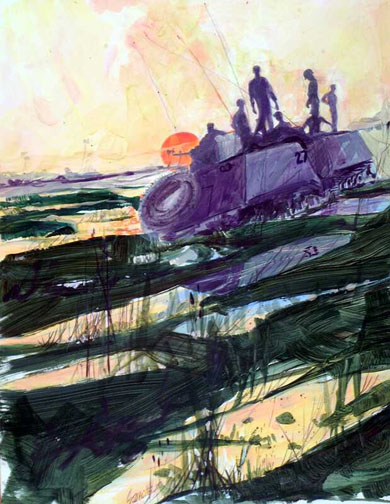
BOG-DOWN by Felix R. Sanchez, CAT I, 1966

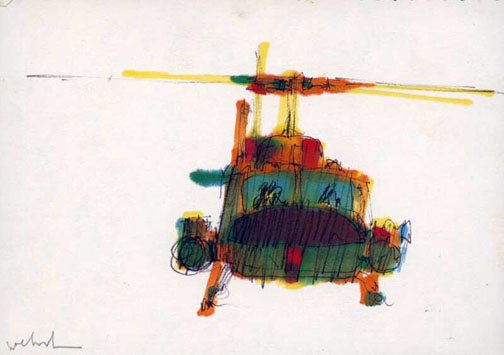
GUNSHIP by John O. Wehrle, CAT I, 1966

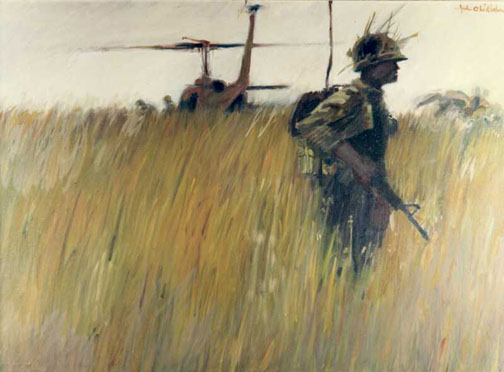
LANDING ZONE by John O. Wehrle, CAT I, 1966

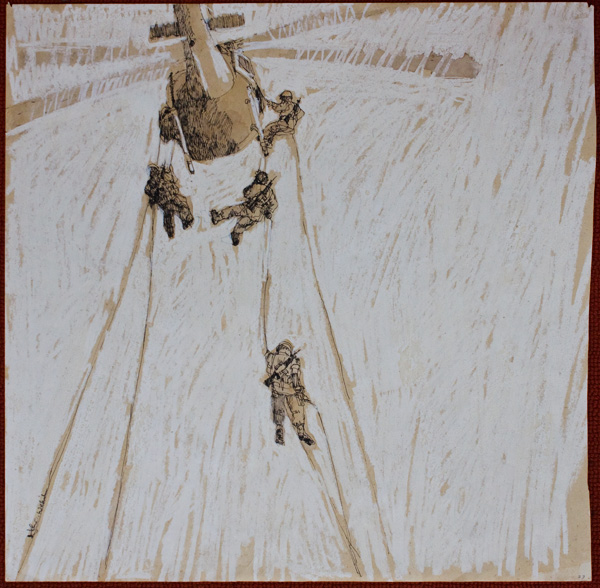
RAPPELING by John O. Wehrle, CAT I, 1966

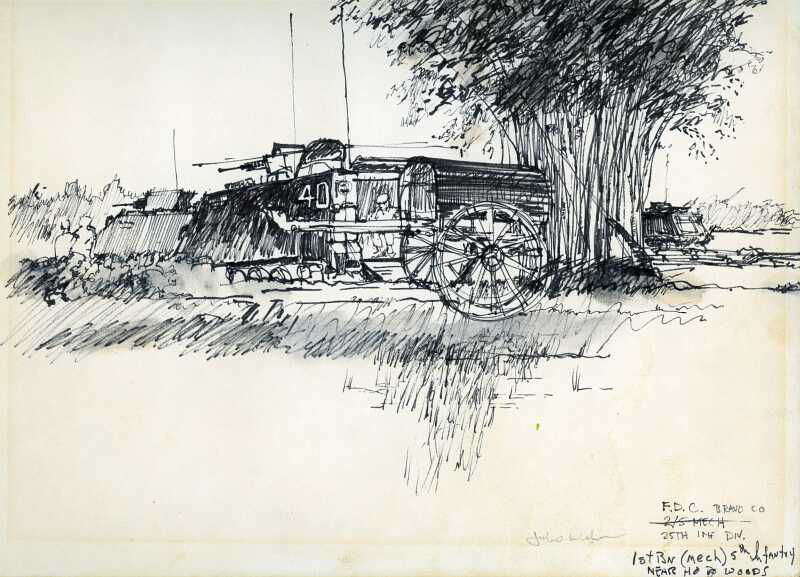
FDC BRAVO CO 25TH INFANTRY DIVISION by John O. Wehrle, CAT I, 1966

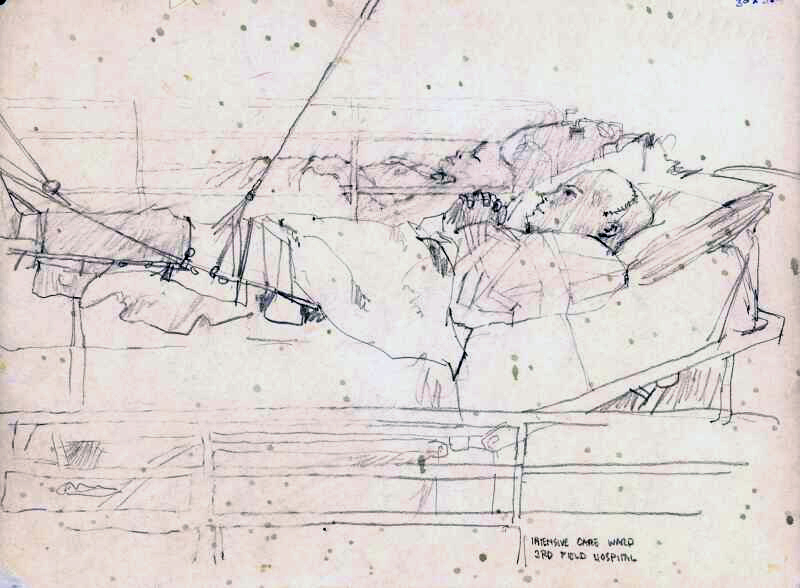
INTENSIVE CARE WARD 3RD FIELD HOSPITAL RVN by John O. Wehrle, CAT I, 1966

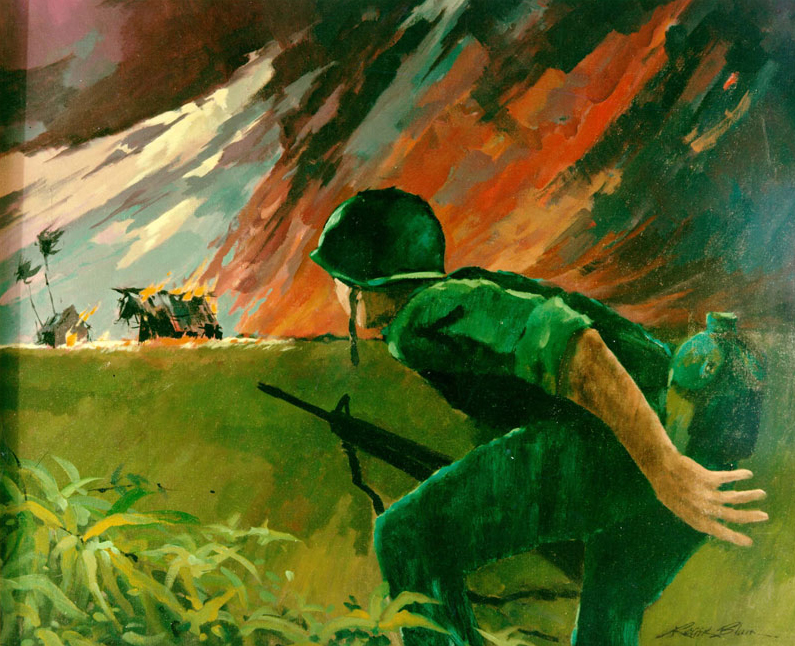
ATTACK AT TWILIGHT by Roger Blum, CAT I, 1966

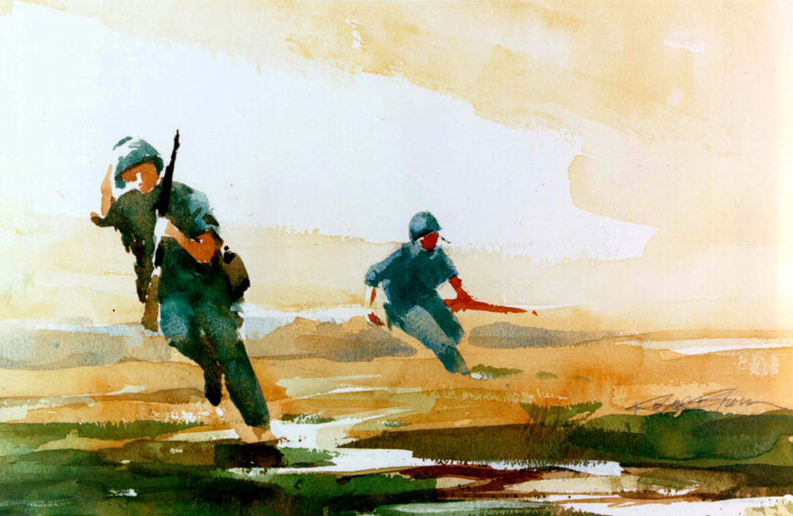
INFANTRY SOLDIERS by Roger Blum, CAT I, 1966

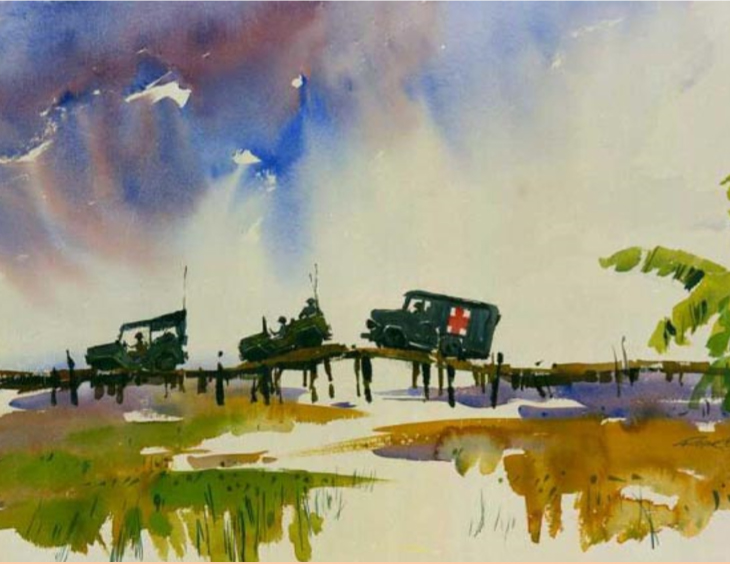
CONVOY by Roger Blum, CAT I, 1966

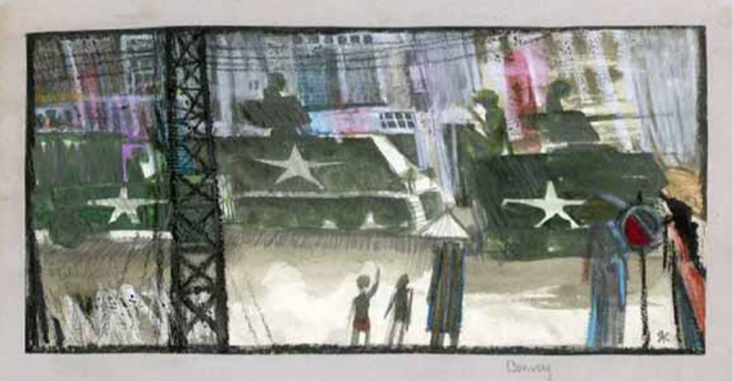
CONVOY THROUGH SAIGON by Robert Knight, CAT I, 1966

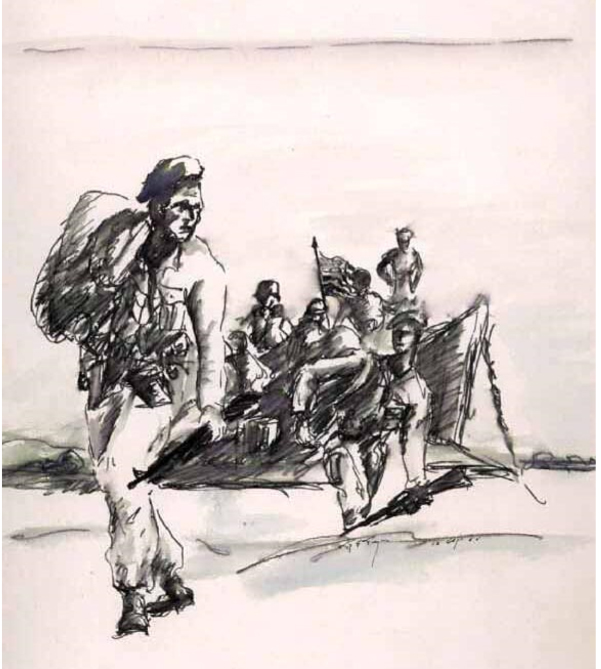
REINFORCEMENTS LANDING by Ronald Pepin, CAT I, 1966

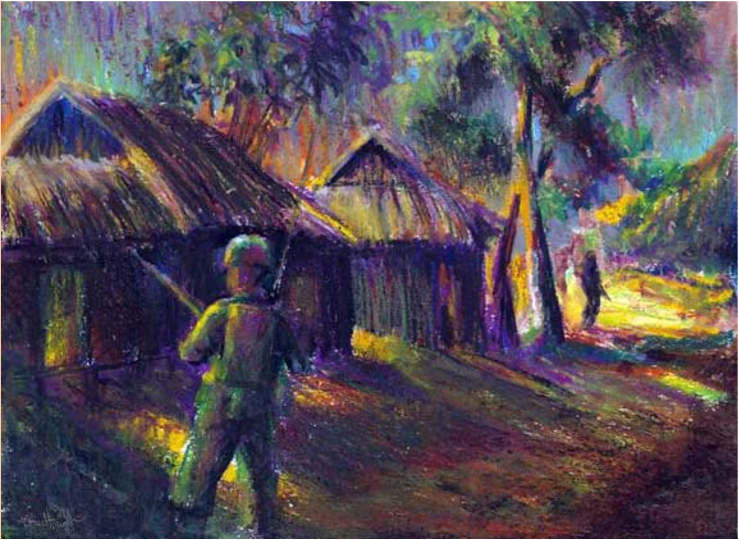
SEARCHING A VILLAGE by Robert Knight, CAT I, 1966

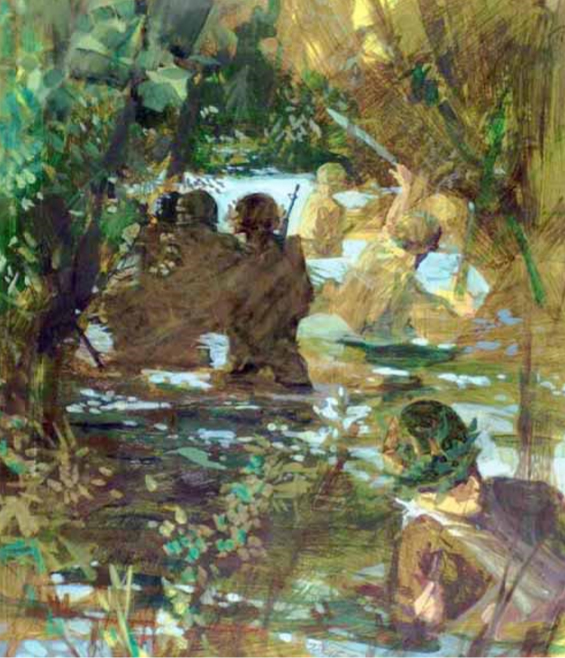
SWAMP PATROL by Felix Sanchez, CAT I, 1966

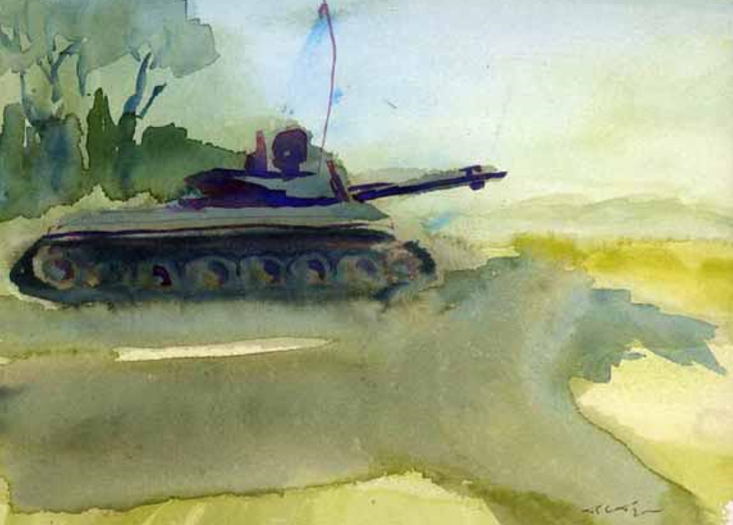
TANK IN HOBO WOODS by Ronald Pepin, CAT I, 1966

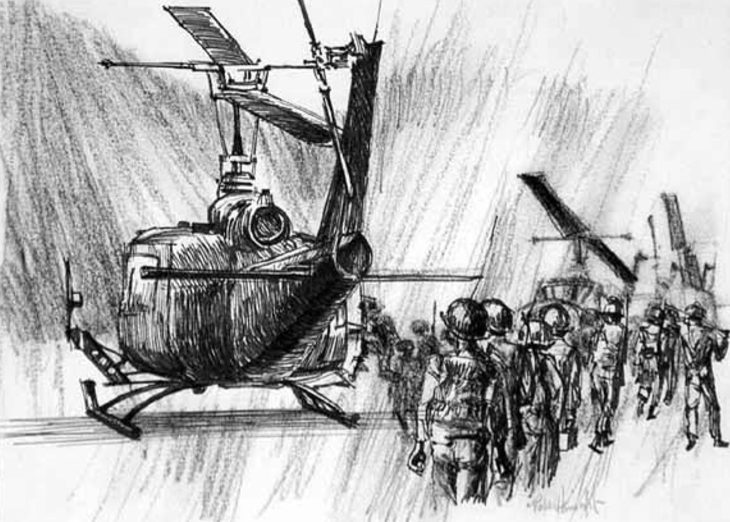
VIETNAMESE SOLDIERS BOARD HELICOPTER by Robert Knight, CAT I, 1966

=== CAT II 15 October 1966 to 15 February 1967 ===
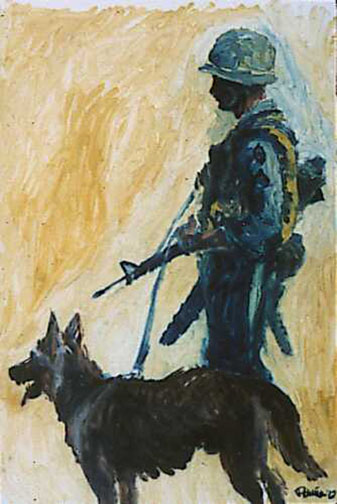
SCOUT DOG by Augustine G. Acuna, CAT II, 1966–67

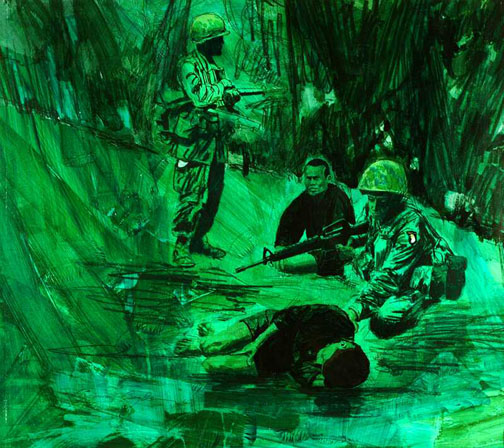
BODY COUNT by Alexander A. Bogdanovich, CAT II, 1966–67

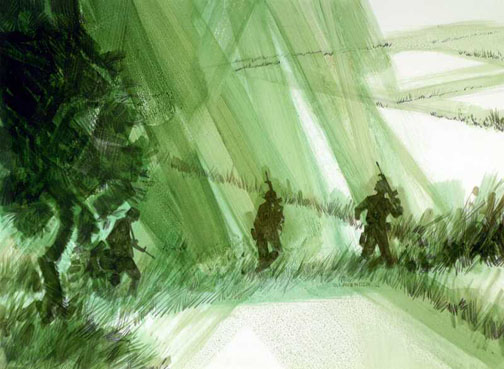
RECONNAISSANCE PATROL NEAR SOUTH CHINA SEA by David M. Lavender, CAT II, 1966–67

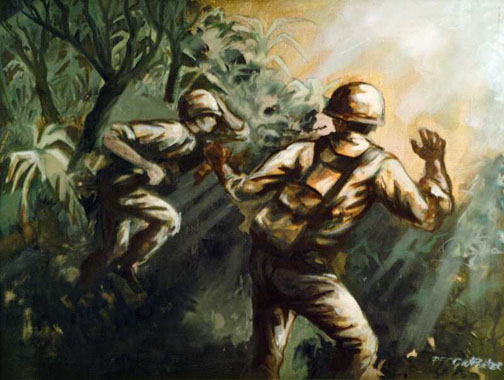
SECOND PLATOON ASSAULT by Gary W. Porter, CAT II, 1966–67

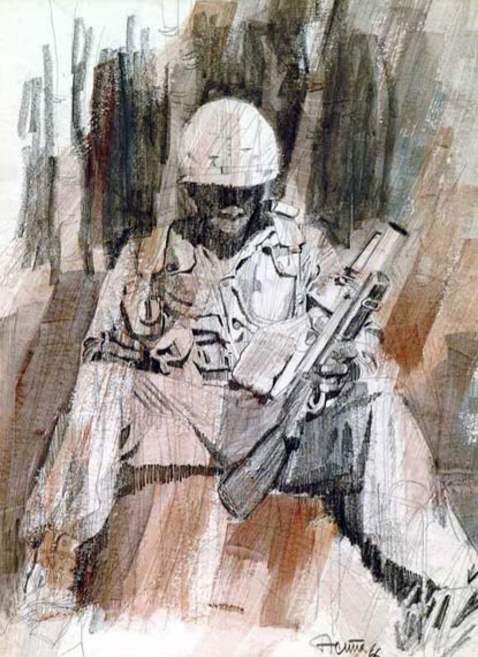
BEAT by Augustine G. Acuna, CAT II, 1966–67

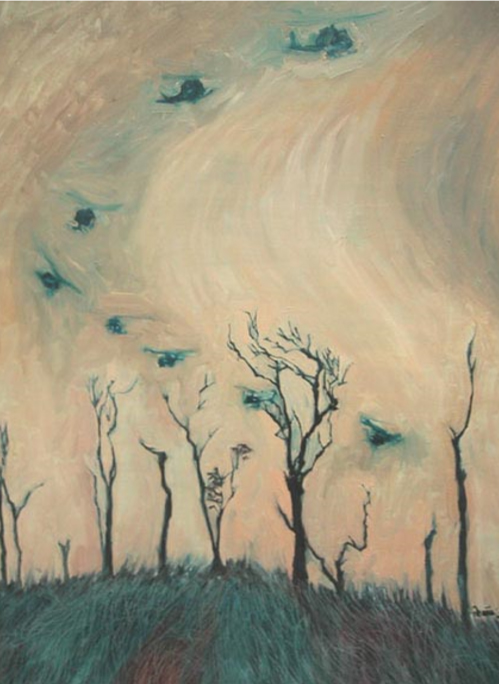
BIRDS OF PREY by Augustine G. Acuna, CAT II, 1966–67

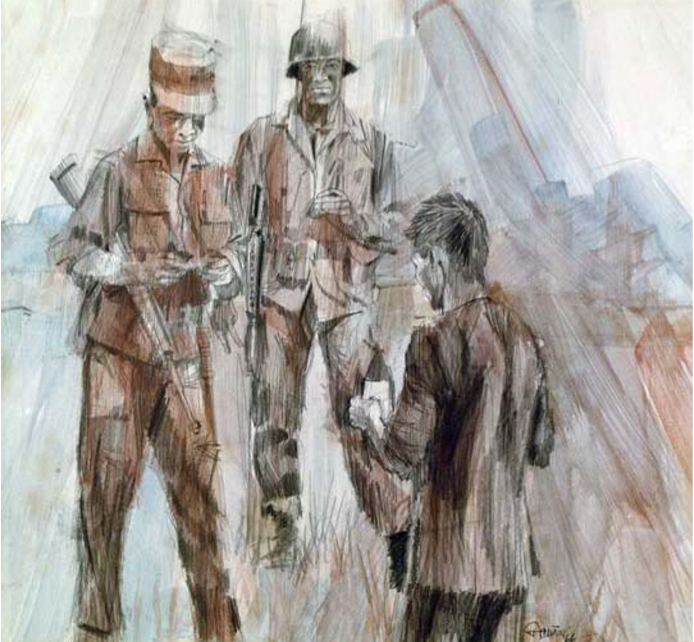
INTERROGATION by Augustine G. Acuna, CAT II, 1966–67

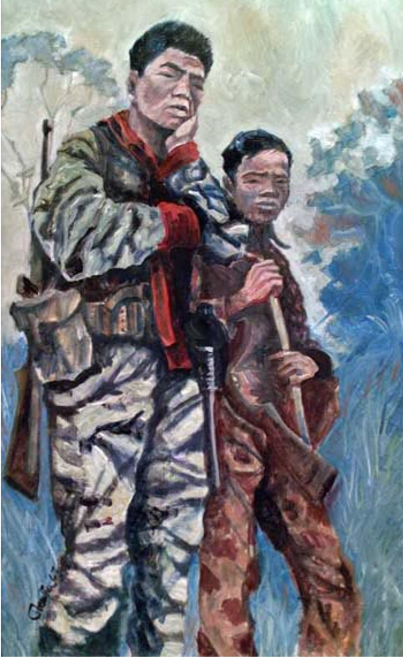
MEMBERS OF THE CIVILIAN IRREGULAR DEFENSE GROUP by Augustine G. Acuna, CAT II, 1966–67

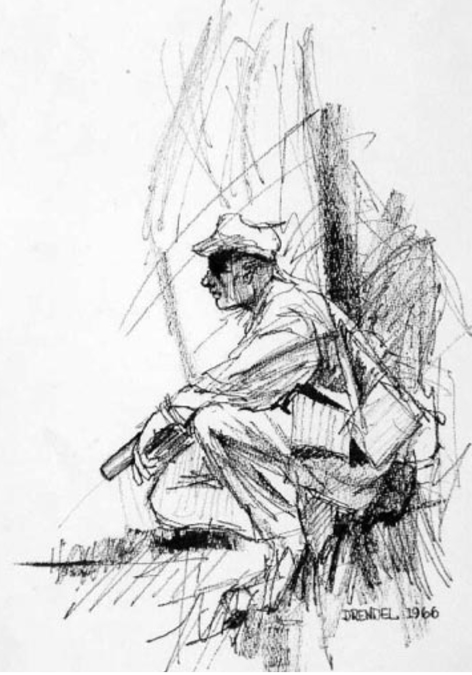
SKETCH OF A SOLDIER I by Theodore E. Drendel, CAT II, 1966–67

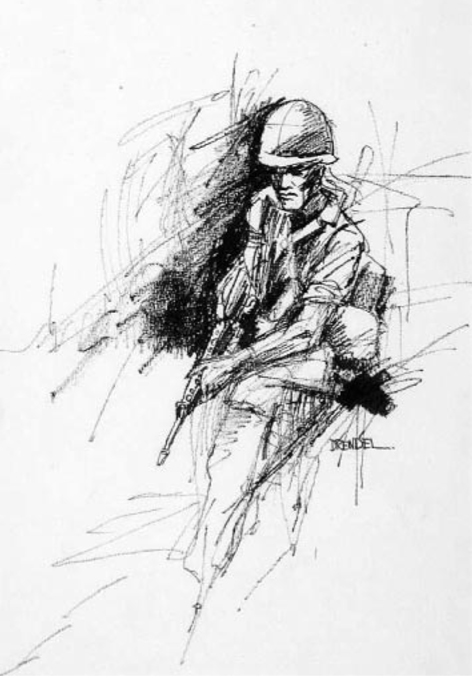
SKETCH OF A SOLDIER II by Theodore E. Drendel, CAT II, 1966–67

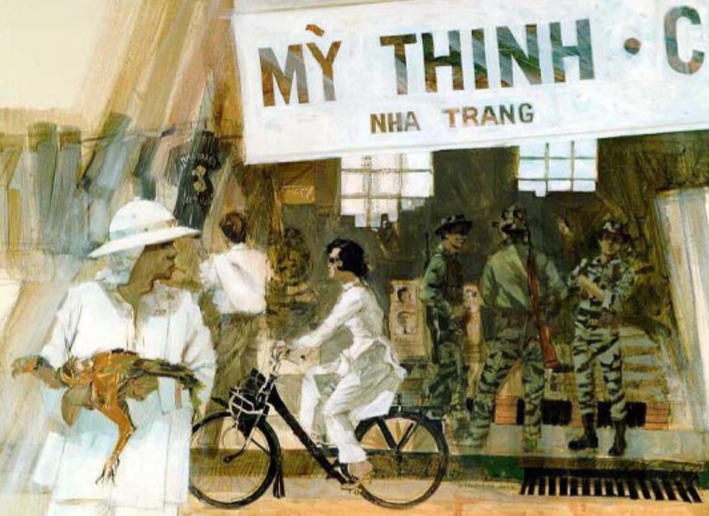
STREET SCENE by David M. Lavender, CAT II, 1966–67

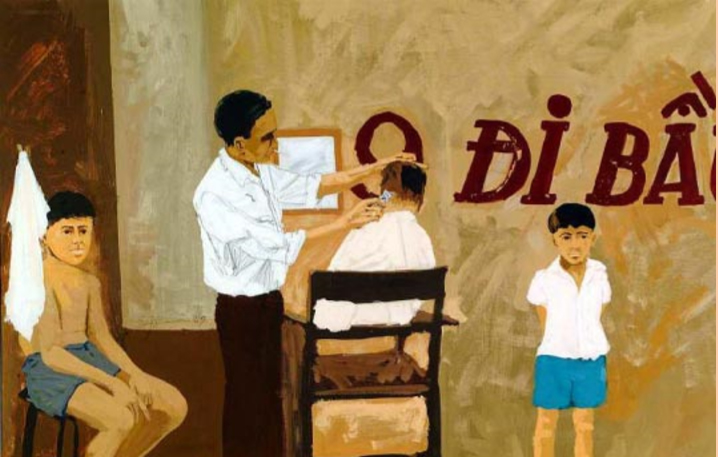
THE BARBER by Alexander A. Bogdanovitch, CAT II, 1966–67

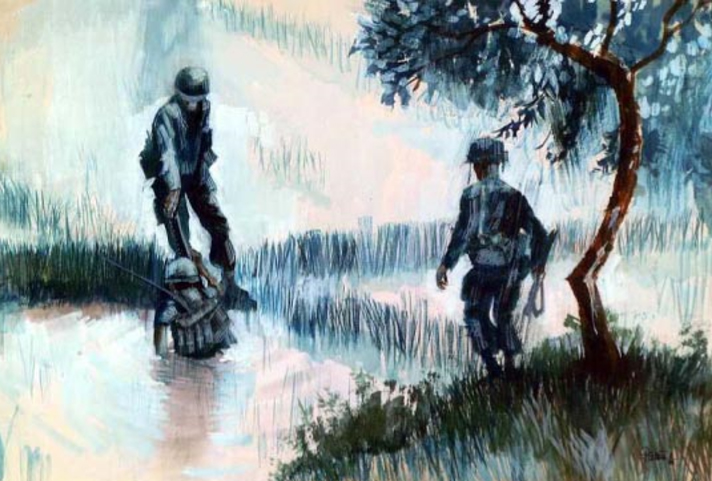
THE RICE PADDIES by Augustine G. Acuna, CAT II, 1966–67

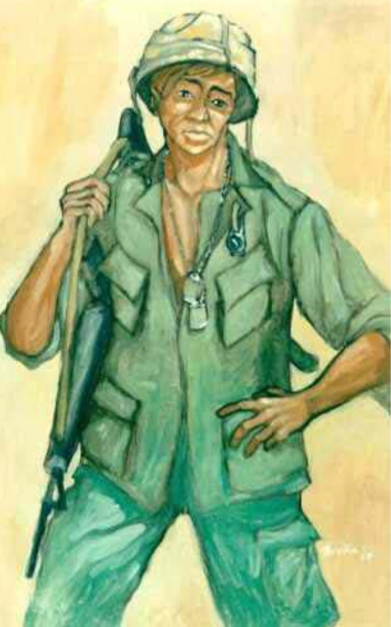
THE VETERAN by Augustine G. Acuna, CAT II, 1966–67

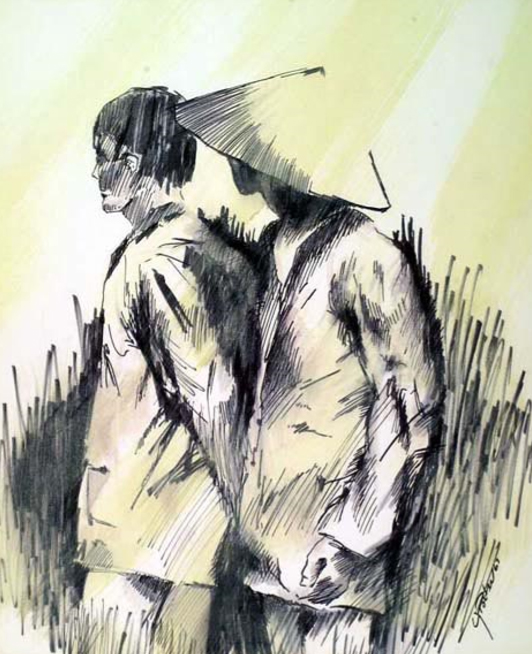
VIETCONG by Gary W. Porter, CAT II, 1966–67

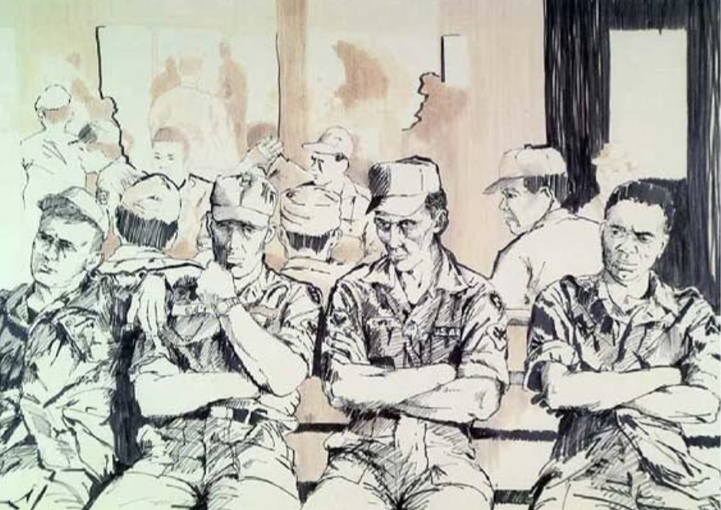
WAITING by Gary W. Porter, CAT II, 1966–67

=== CAT III 16 February 1967 to 17 June 1967 ===
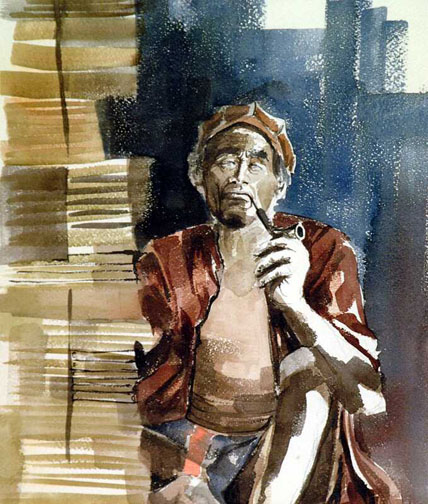
MONTAGNARD NEAR PLEIDJERONG I by Michael R. Crook, CAT III, 1967

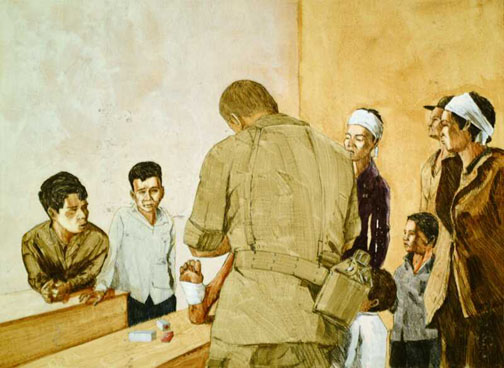
MED CAP by Dennis O. McGee, CAT III, 1967

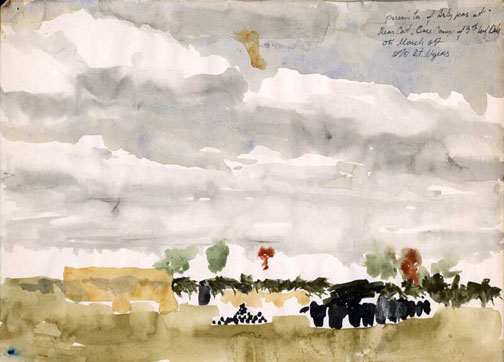
PERIMETER OF ARTY PASS AT BEAR CAT by Robert T. Myers, CAT III, 1967

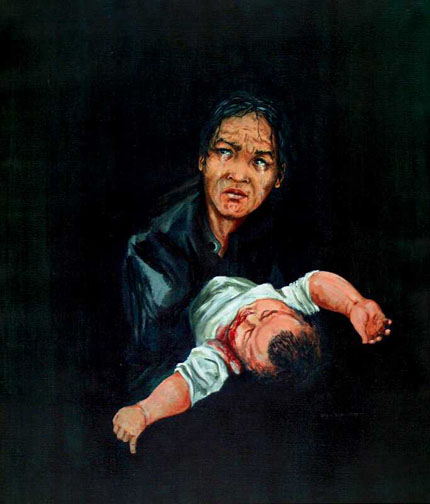
THE INNOCENT by Kenneth J. Scowcroft, CAT III, 1967

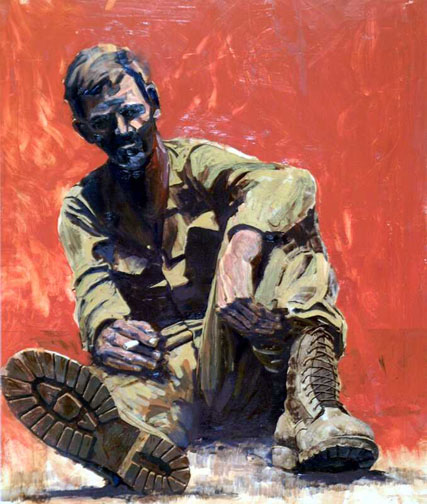
AFTER THE BATTLE by Stephen H. Sheldon CAT III 1967

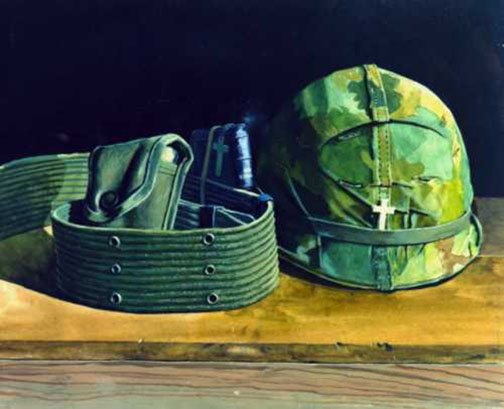
CHAPLAIN MARTINS BIBLE Stephen H. Sheldon, CAT III, 1967

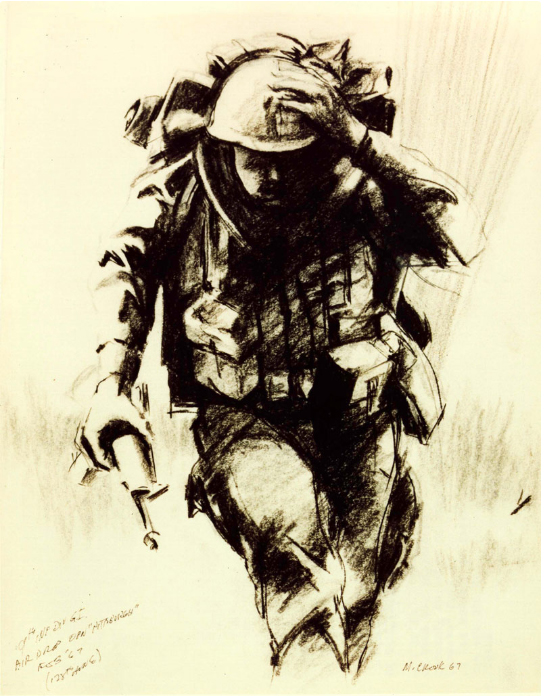
9TH INFANTRY DIVISION GI by Michael R. Crook, CAT III, 1967

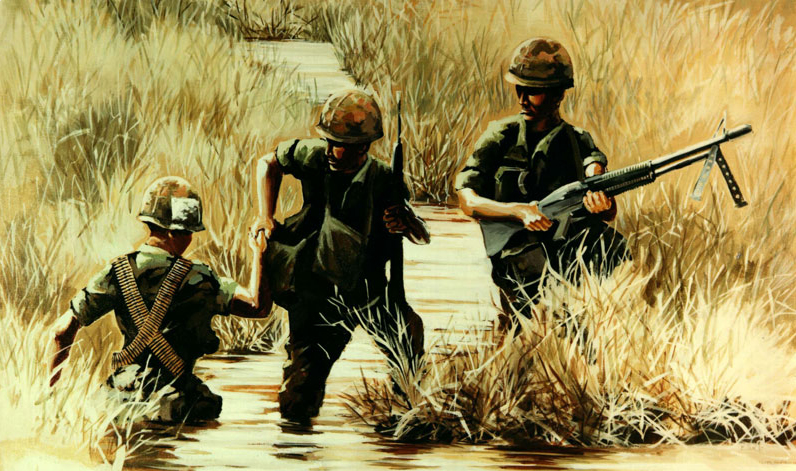
PERIMETER PATROL by Michael R. Crook, CAT III, 1967

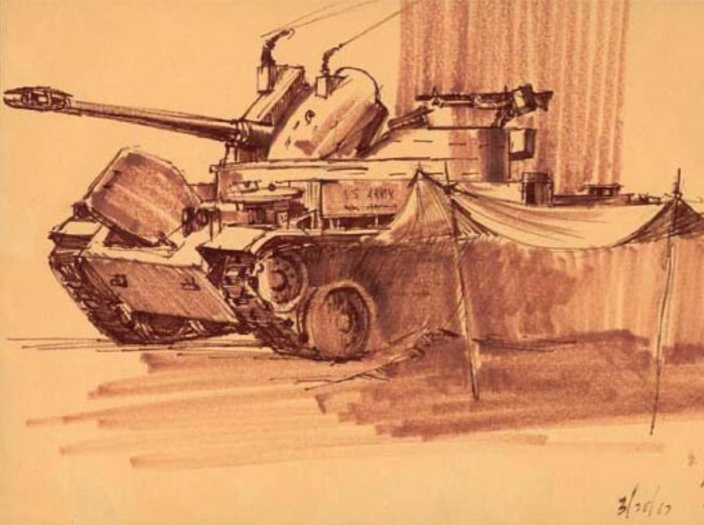
ARMORED VEHICLE AT BONG SON by Dennis O. McGee, CAT III, 1967

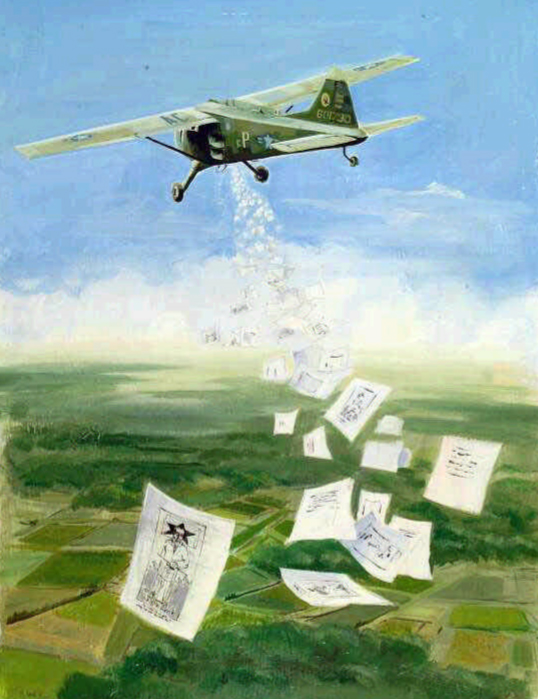
CHIEU HOI OR DIE by Michael R. Crook, CAT III, 1967

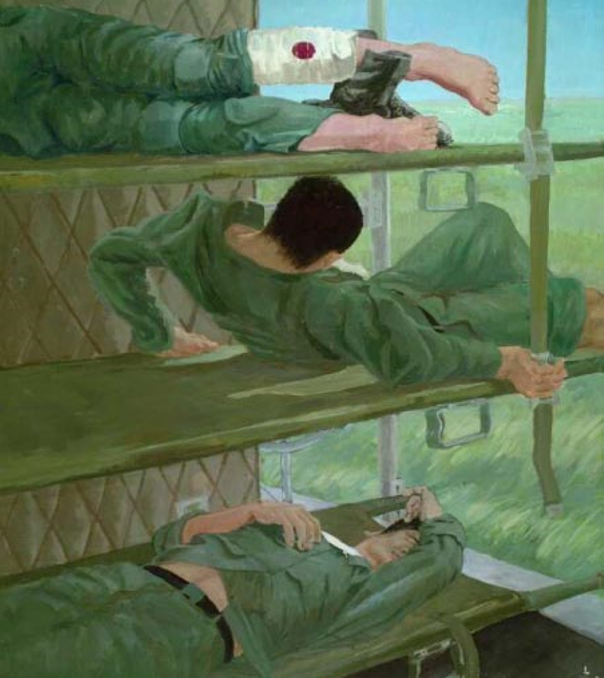
DELTA DUST OFF by Robert T. Myers, CAT III, 1967

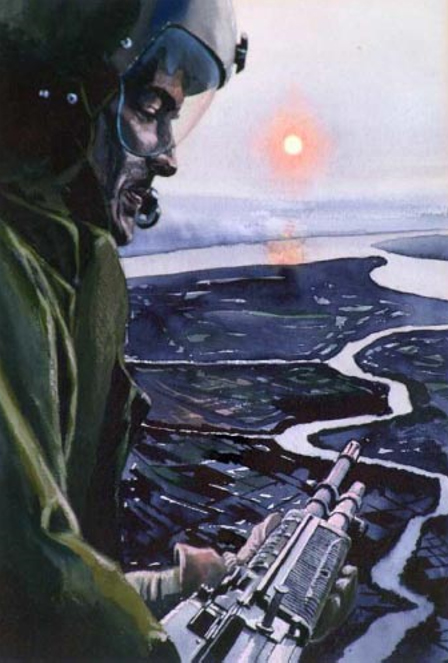
DELTA SUNRISE by Stephen H. Sheldon, CAT III, 1967

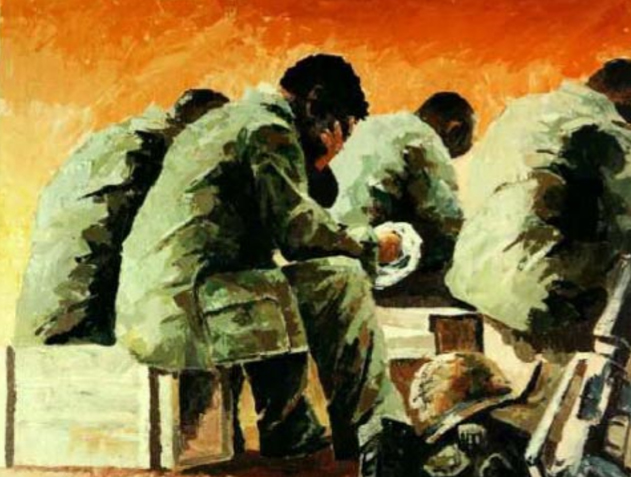
EASTER SUNRISE by Michael R. Crook, CAT III, 1967

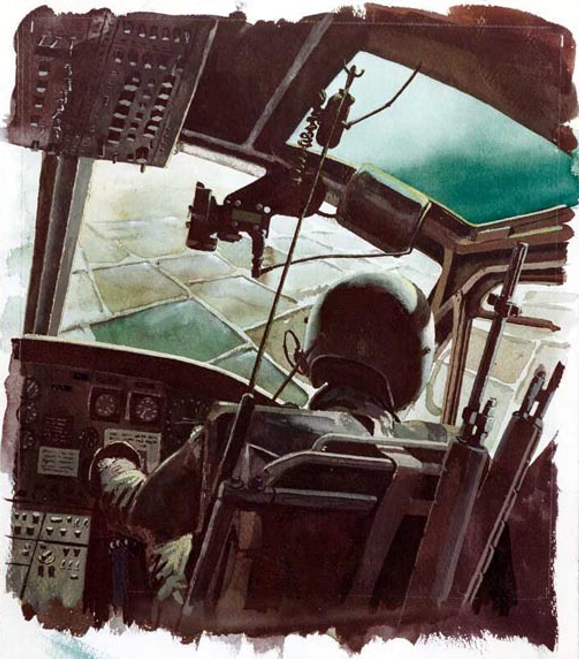
GUNSHIP IN THE DELTA by Stephen H. Sheldon, CAT III, 1967

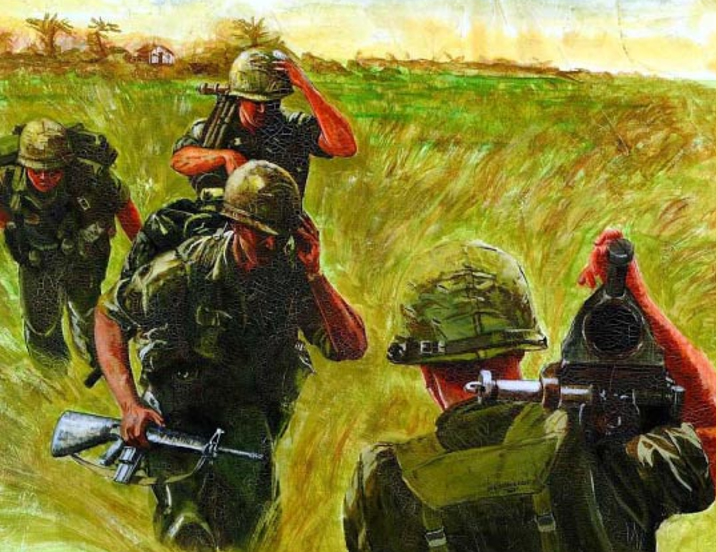
WELCOME RELIEF by Kenneth J. Scowcroft, CAT III, 1967

=== CAT IV 15 August to 31 December 1967 ===
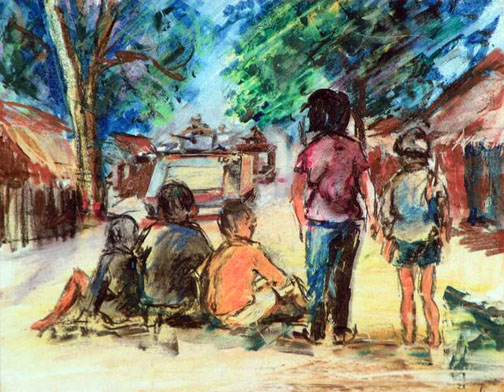
GI CONVOY-EASY TOUCH by Samuel E. Alexander, CAT IV, 1967

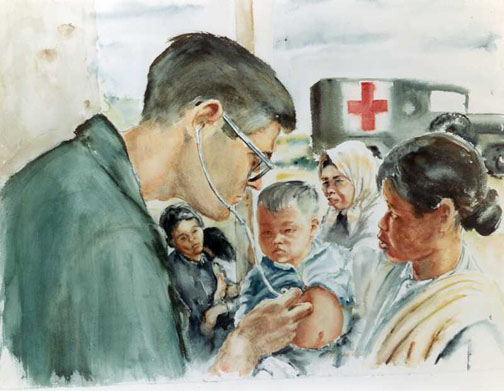
AMERICAN DOCTOR EXAMINES VIETNAMESE CHILD by Samuel E. Alexander, CAT IV, 1967

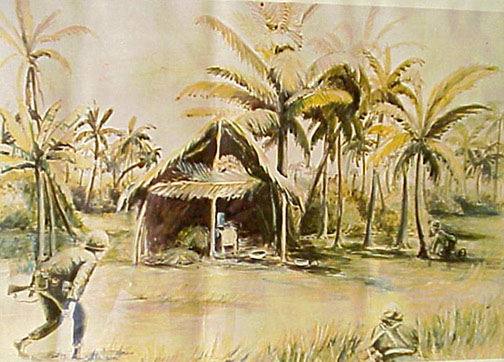
RECONNAISSANCE, LONG BINH by Daniel T. Lopez, CAT IV, 1967

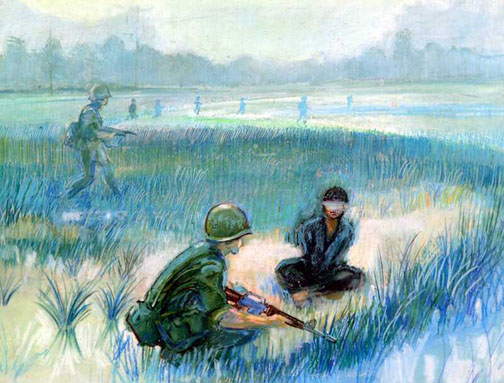
CHARLIE SUBDUED by Burdell Moody, CAT IV, 1967

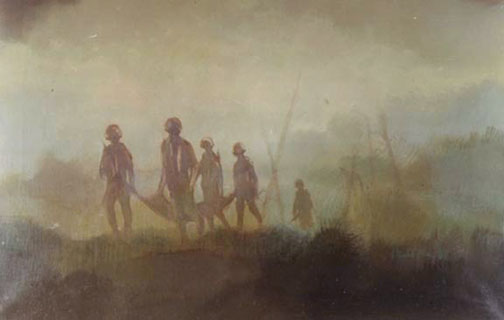
KILLED IN ACTION by Burdell Moody, CAT IV, 1967

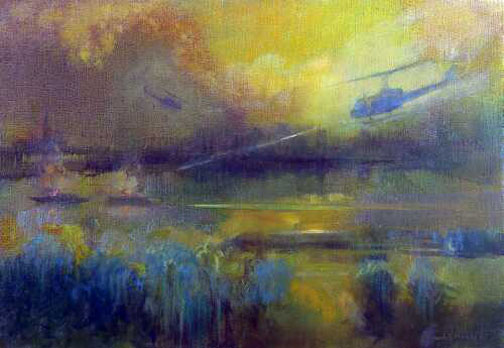
NIGHT OPERATION by Burdell Moody, CAT IV, 1967

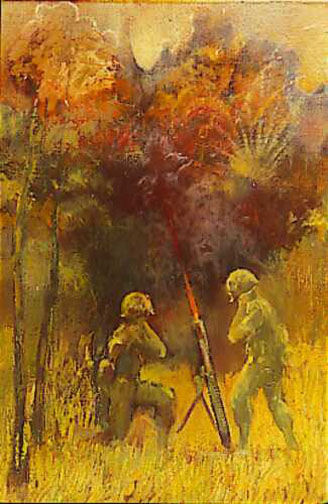
BIG AND LITTLE FIREPOWER by Burdell Moody, CAT IV, 1967

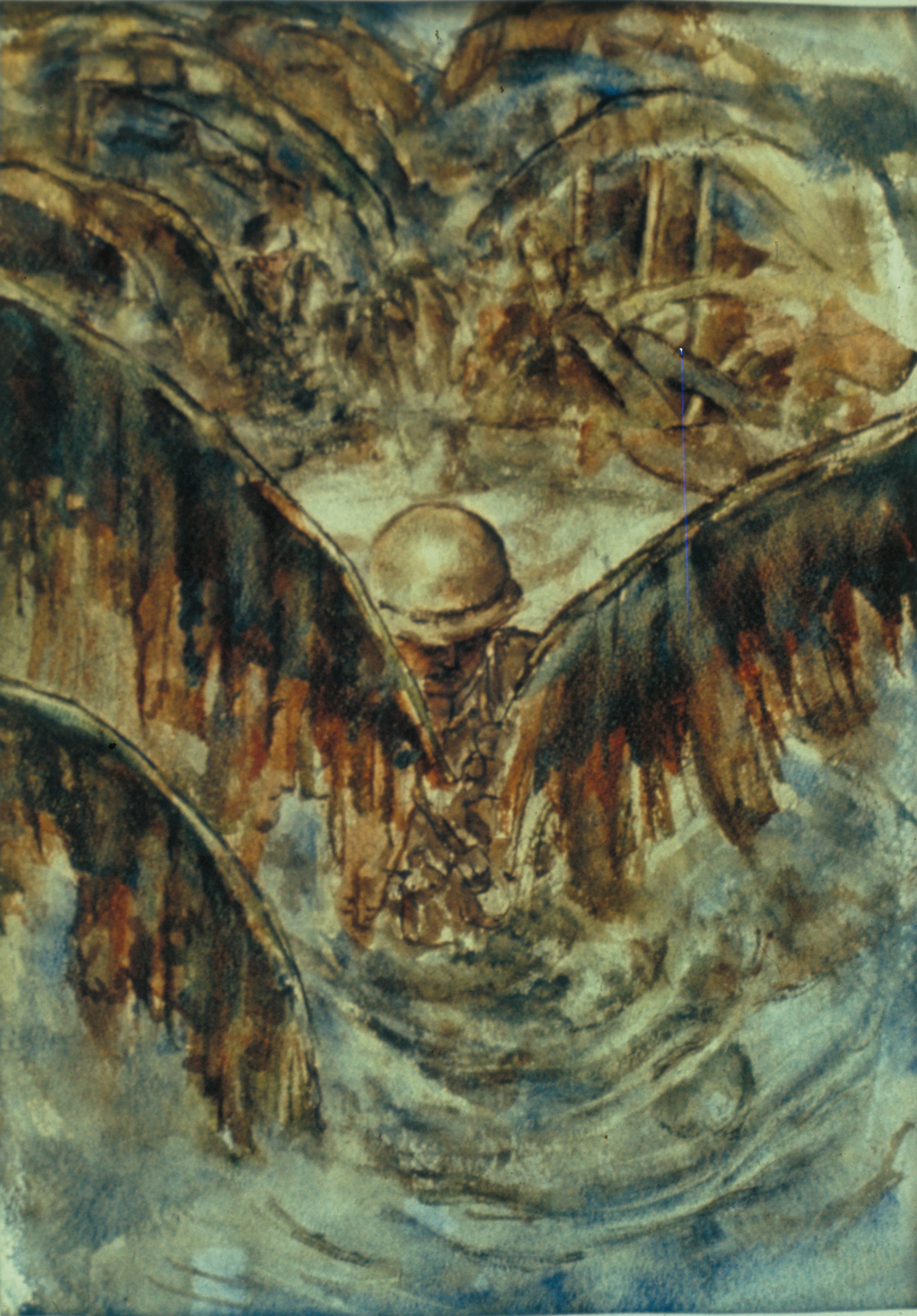
LOOKING DOWN THE TRAIL, Watercolor, by James Pollock, CAT IV, 1967

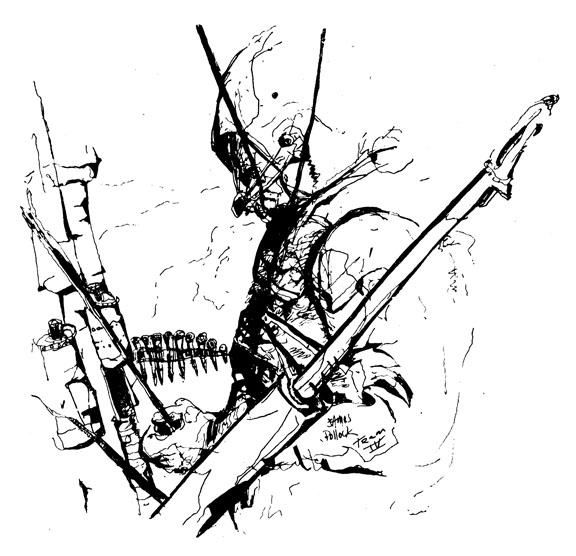
DOOR GUNNER, Pen and Ink, by James Pollock, CAT IV, 1967

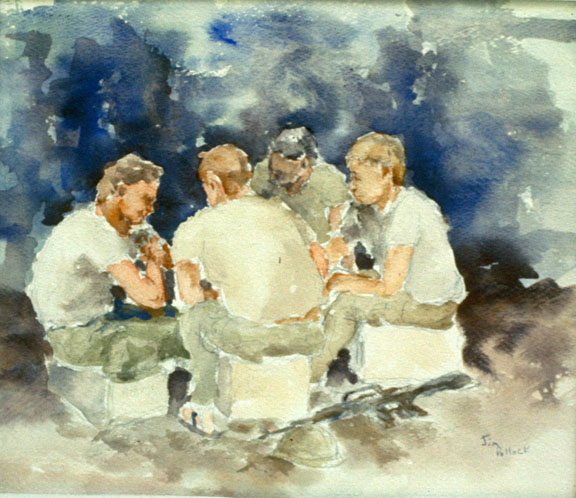
GI CARD GAME, Watercolor, by James Pollock, CAT IV, 1967

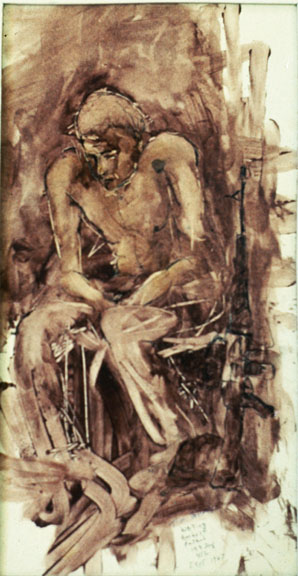
LONESOME, Mixed Media, by James Pollock, CAT IV, 1967

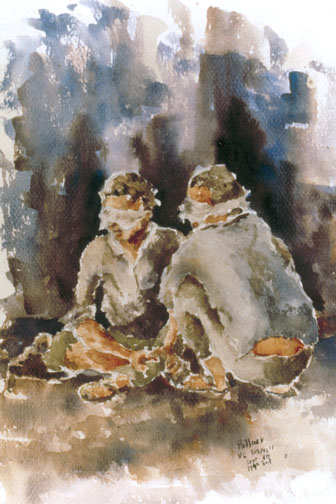
WAITING INTERROGATION,199th LT INF BG, Watercolor, by James Pollock, CAT IV, 1967

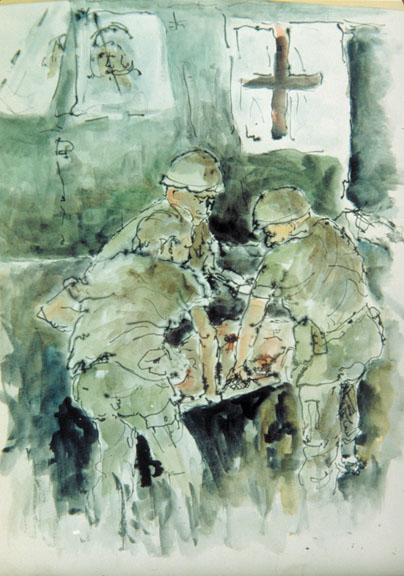
WAITING TO LIFT OFF, Ink/Watercolor Wash, by James Pollock, CAT IV, 1967

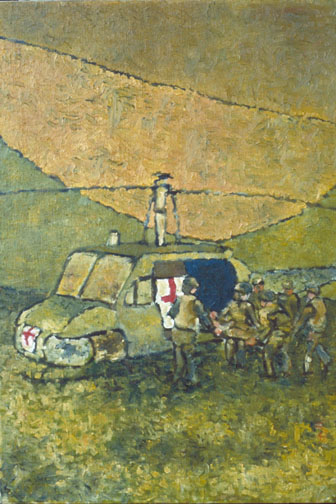
MED EVACUATION (93rd EVACUATION), Oil, by James Pollock, CAT IV, 1967

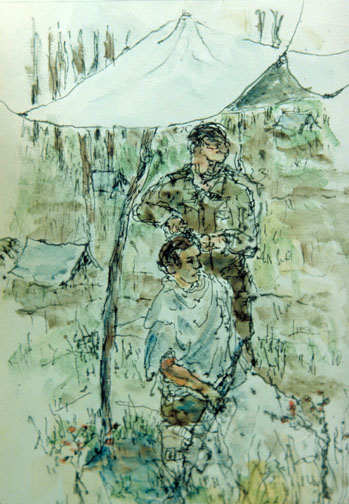
FIELD HAIRCUT AT BIG RED ONE, Ink/Watercolor wash, by James Pollock, CAT IV, 1967

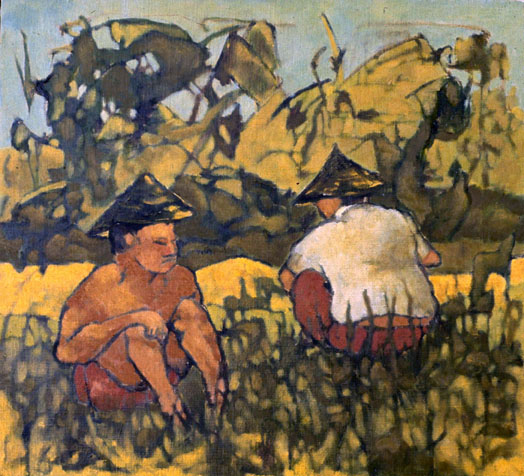
LOCALS, Oil, by James Pollock, CAT IV, 1967

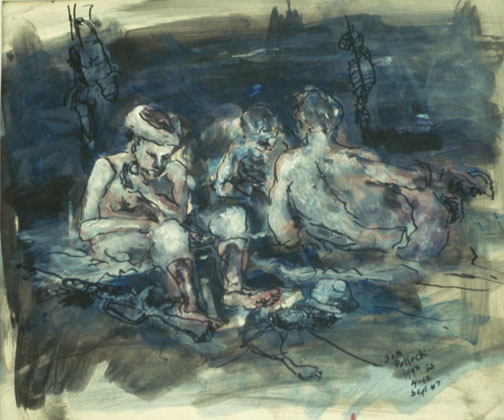
199th SOLDIERS WAIT, Gouache, by James Pollock, CAT IV, 1967

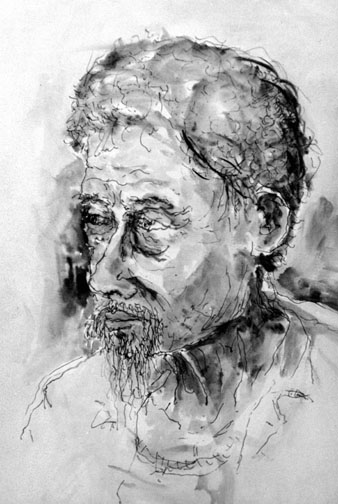
OLD VIETNAMESE MAN, Ink Wash, by James Pollock, CAT IV, 1967

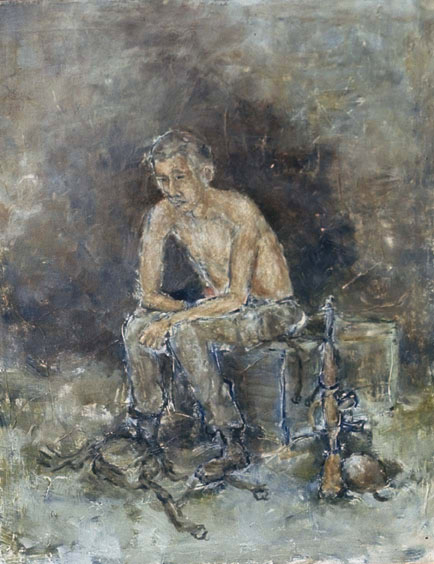
BACK FROM PATROL, Oil, by James Pollock, CAT IV, 1967

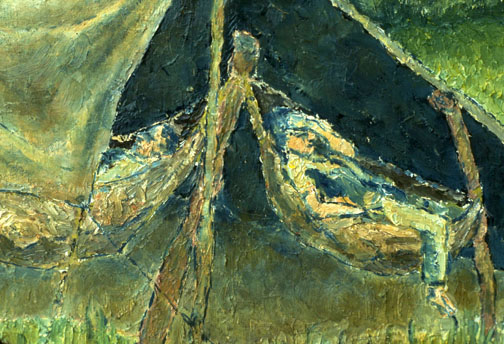
TAKING A BREAK, Oil, by James Pollock, CAT IV, 1967

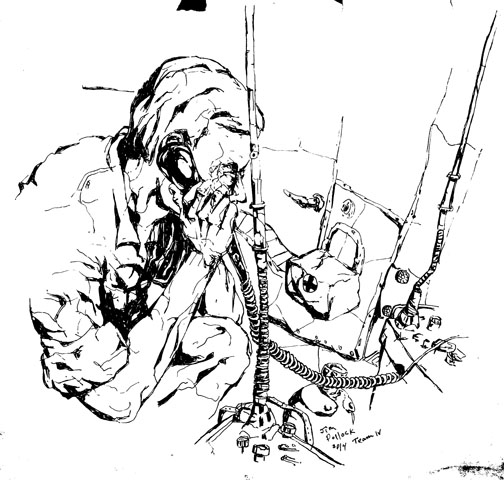
AIR CONTROLLER 196th LIB, Pen and Ink, by James Pollock, CAT IV, 1967

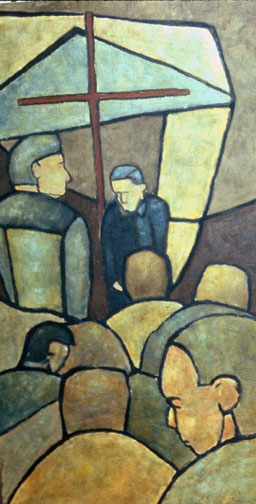
FIELD SERVICE, Oil (unfinished), by James Pollock, CAT IV, 1967

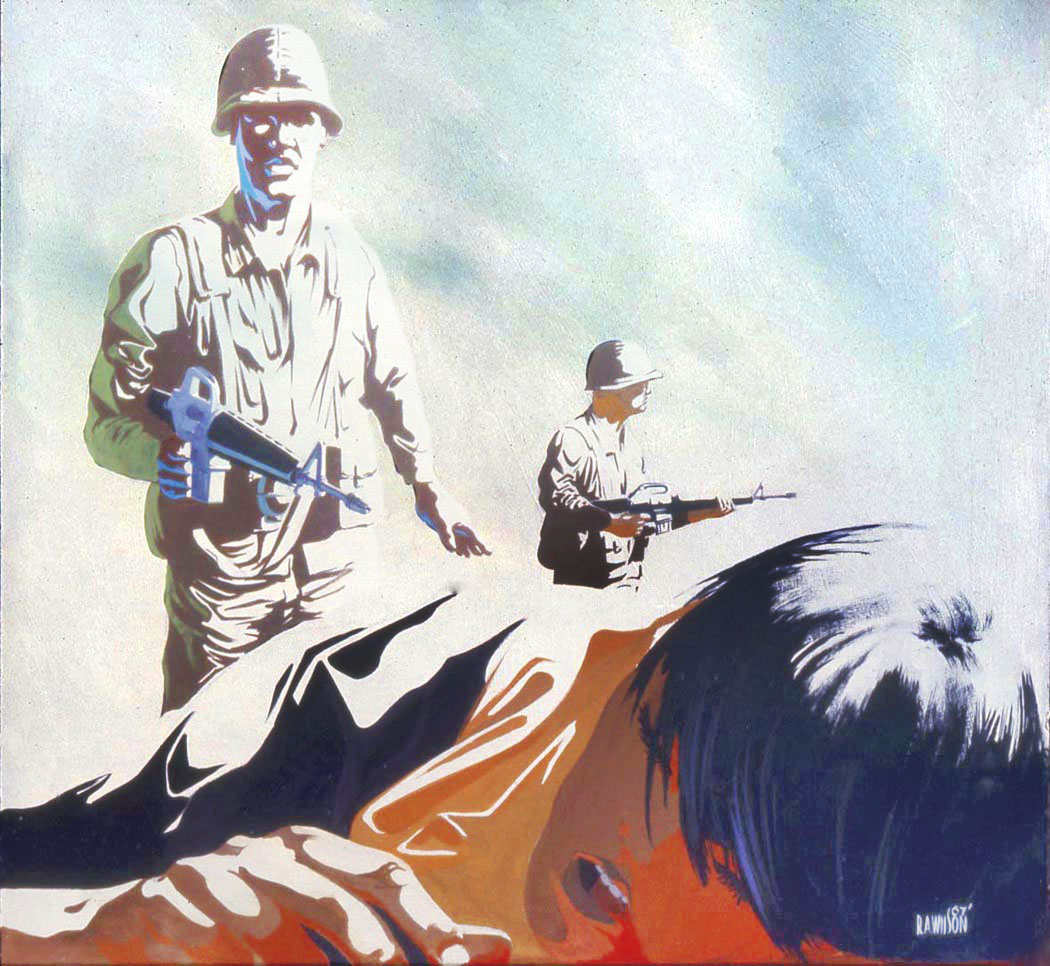
UNREAL by Ronald A. Wilson, CAT IV, 1967

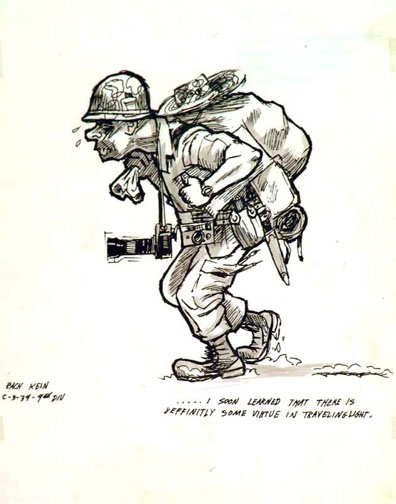
LOADED by Ronald A. Wilson, CAT IV, 1967

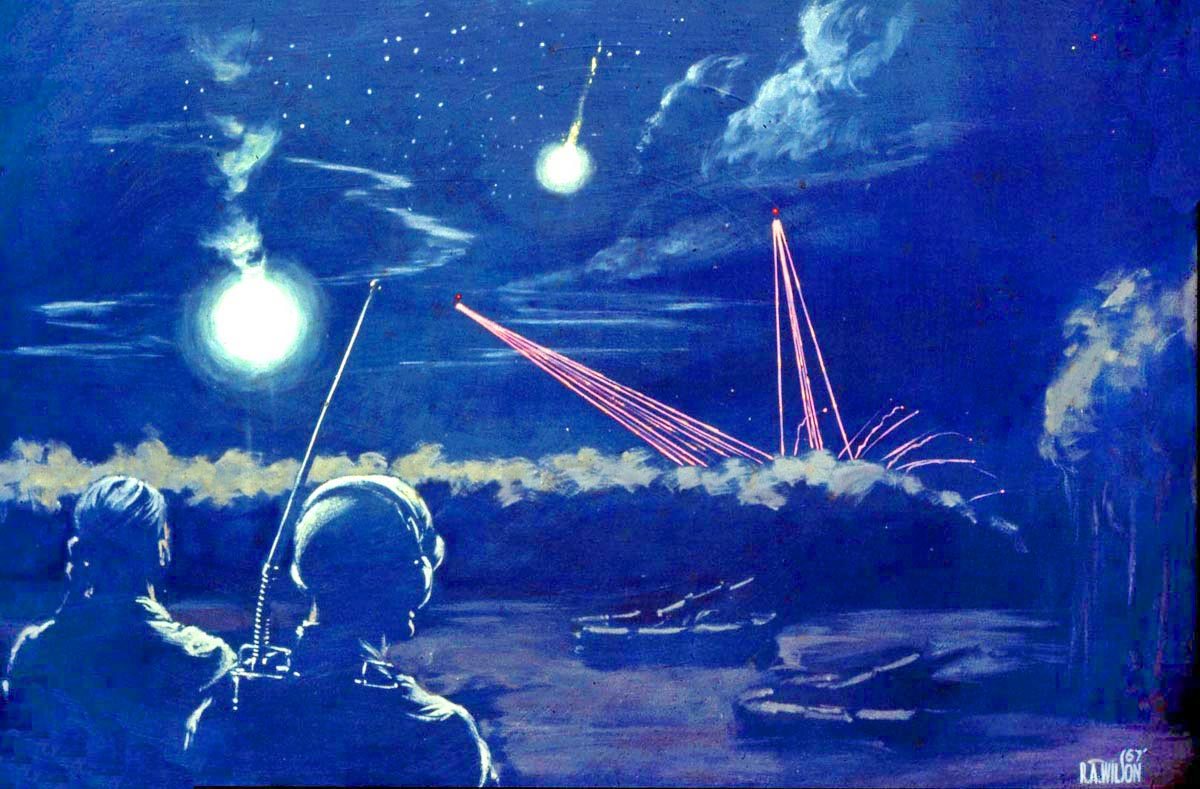
SPOOKY Ronald A. Wilson, CAT IV, 1967

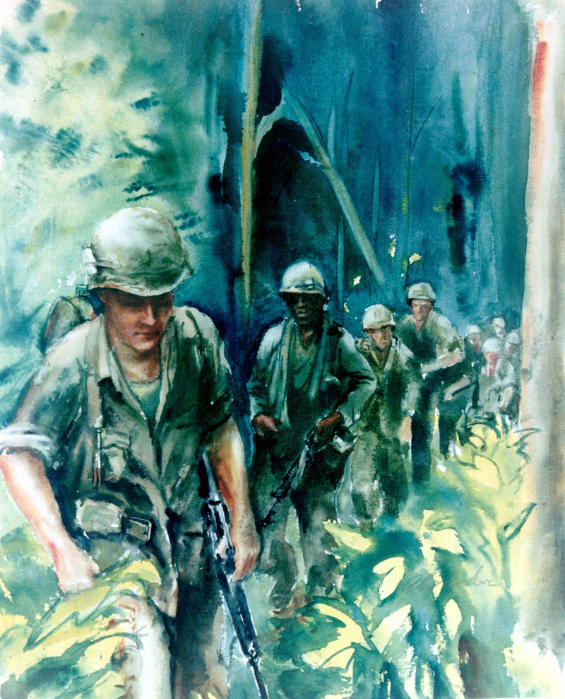
JUNGLE COLUMN by Samuel B. Alexander, CAT IV, 1967

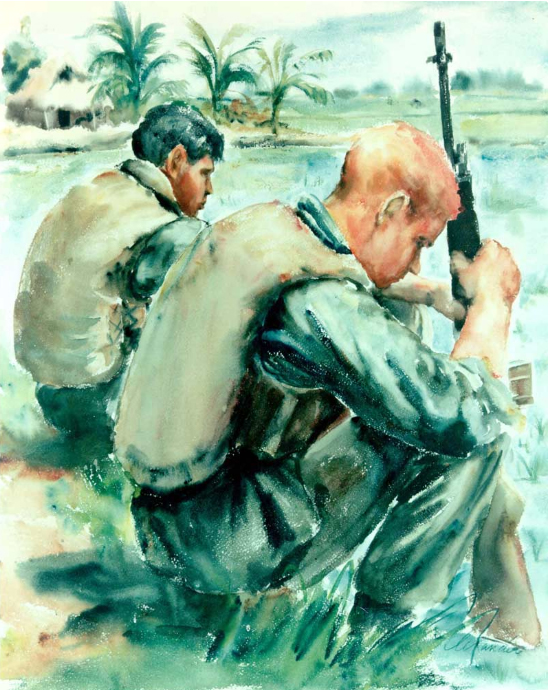
TEN MINUTE BREAK by Samuel B Alexander, CAT IV, 1967

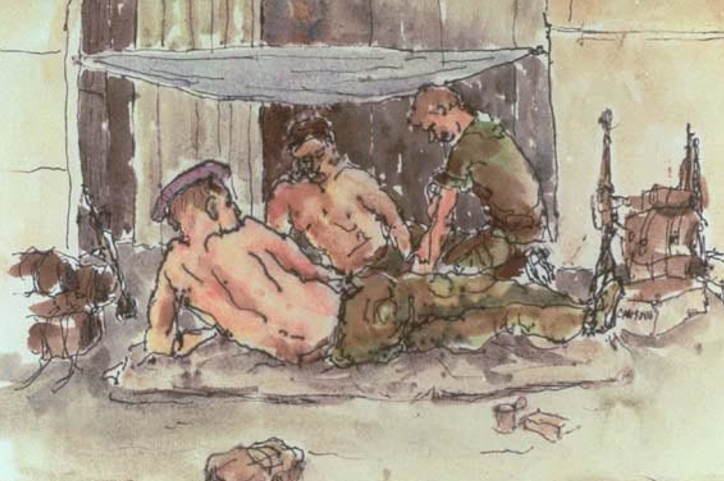
BETWEEN PATROLS 199TH NEAR CAT LAI by James Pollock, CAT IV, 1967

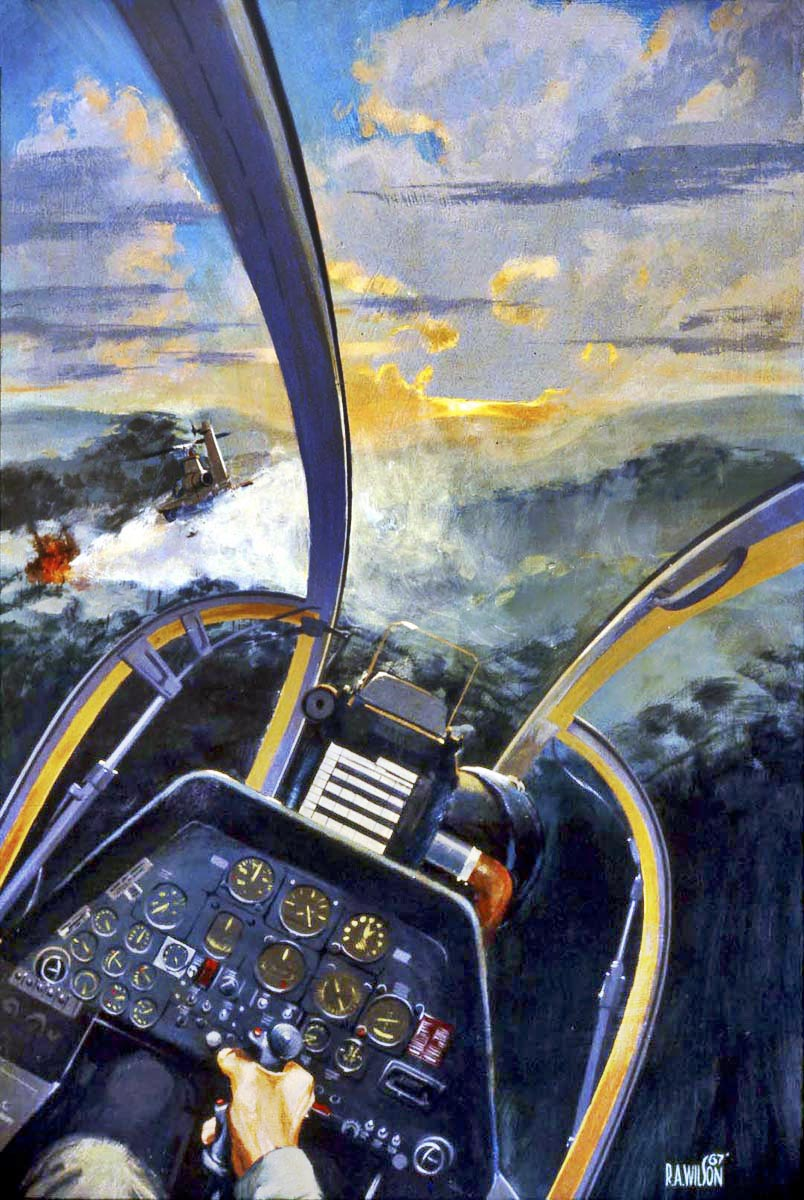
COBRAS by Ronald A. Wilson, CAT IV, 1967

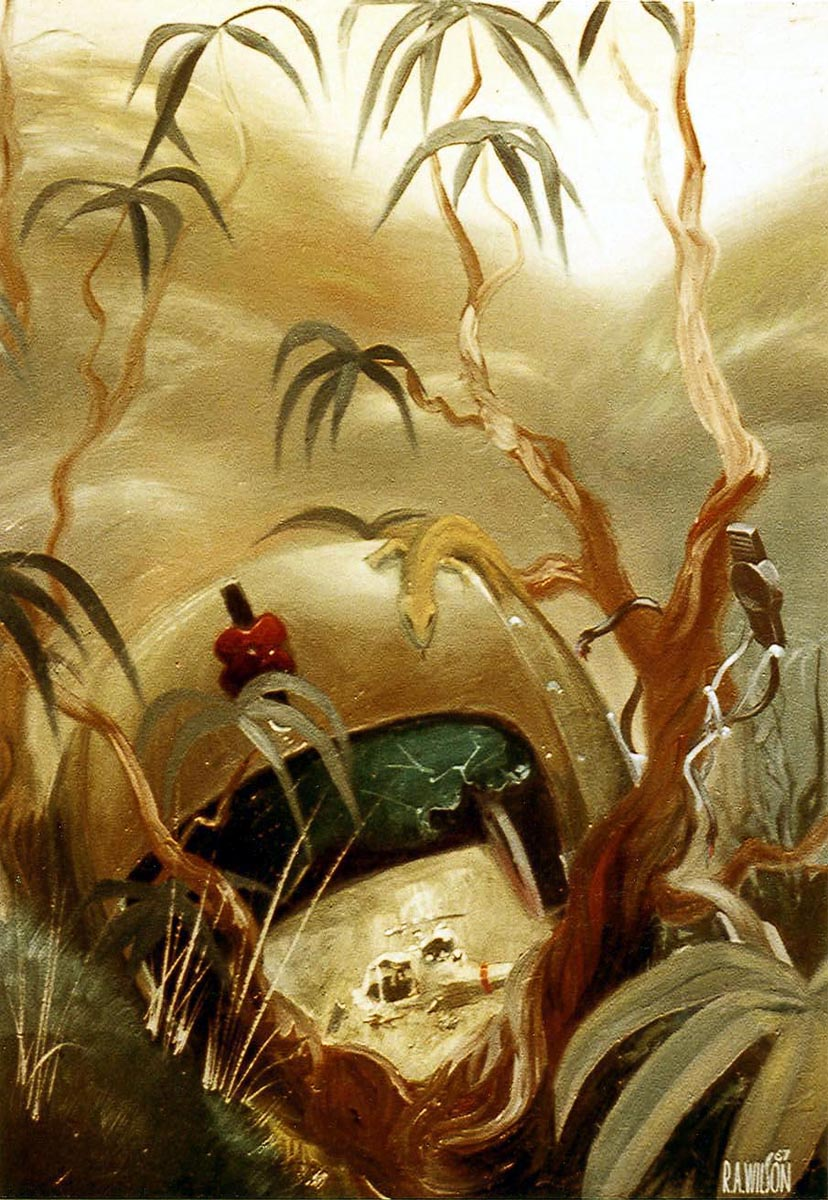
JUNGLE by Ronald A. Wilson, CAT IV, 1967

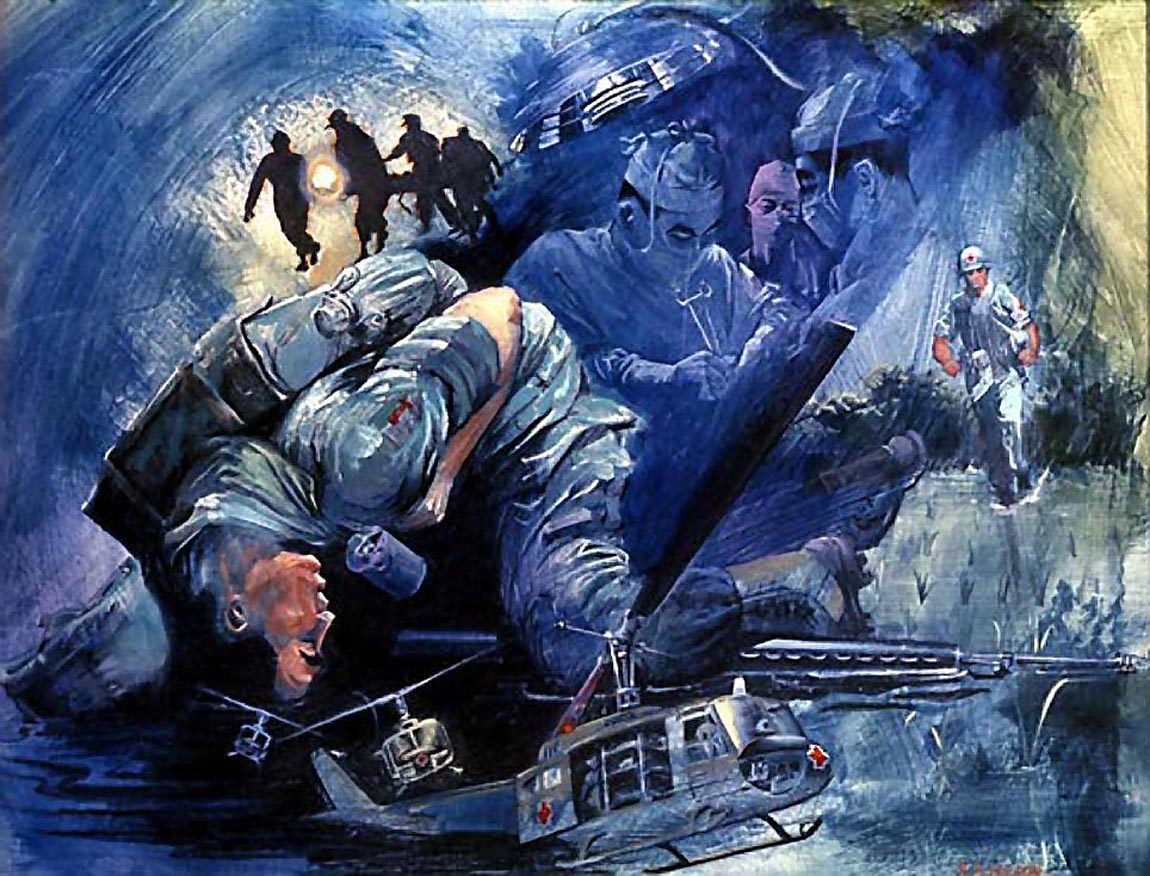
LIFELINE by Ronald A. Wilson, CAT IV, 1967

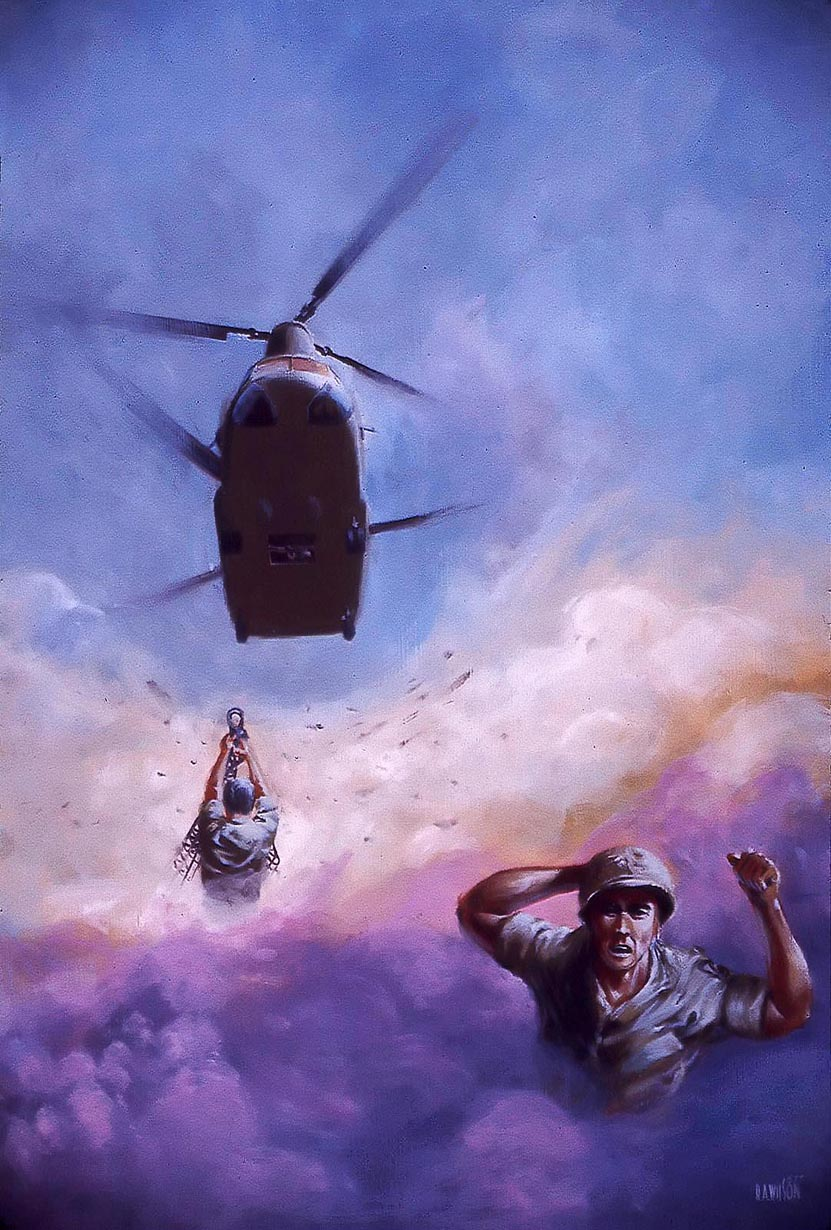
MARKER by Ronald A. Wilson, CAT IV, 1967

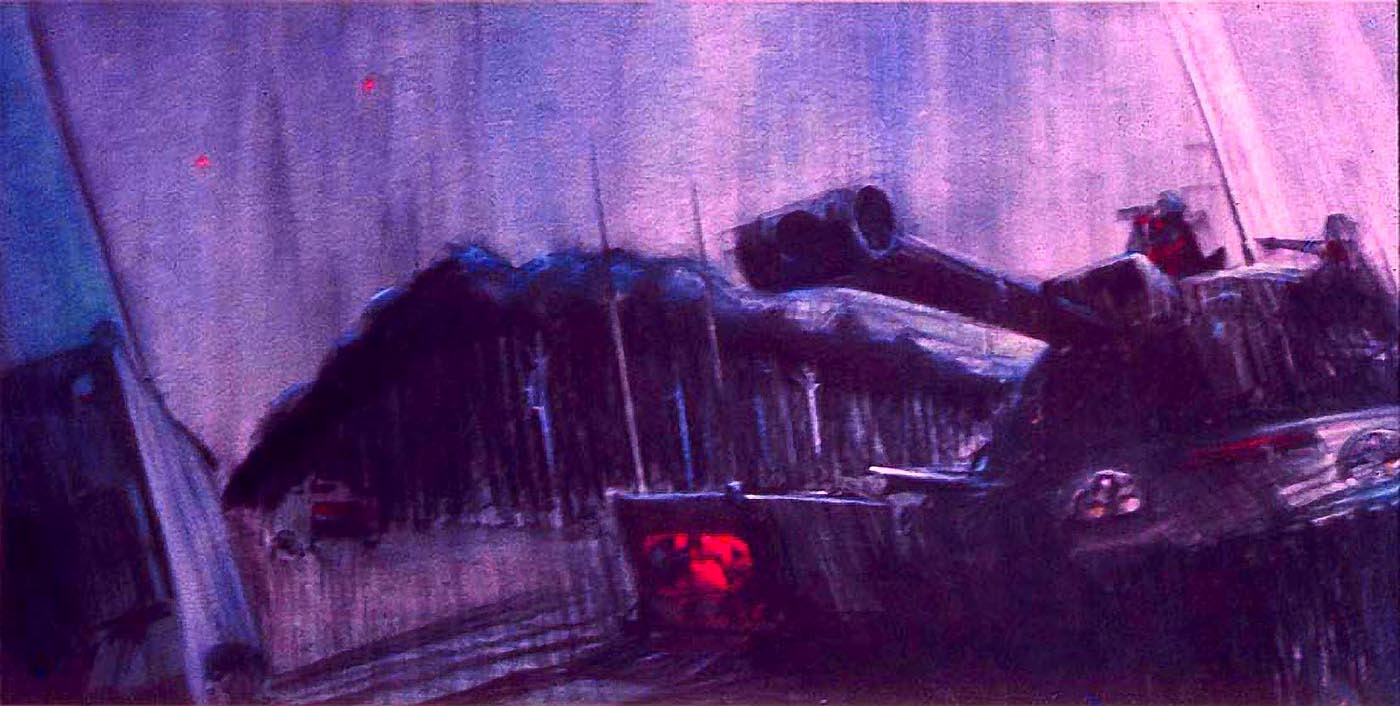
STARLIGHT by Ronald A. Wilson, CAT IV, 1967

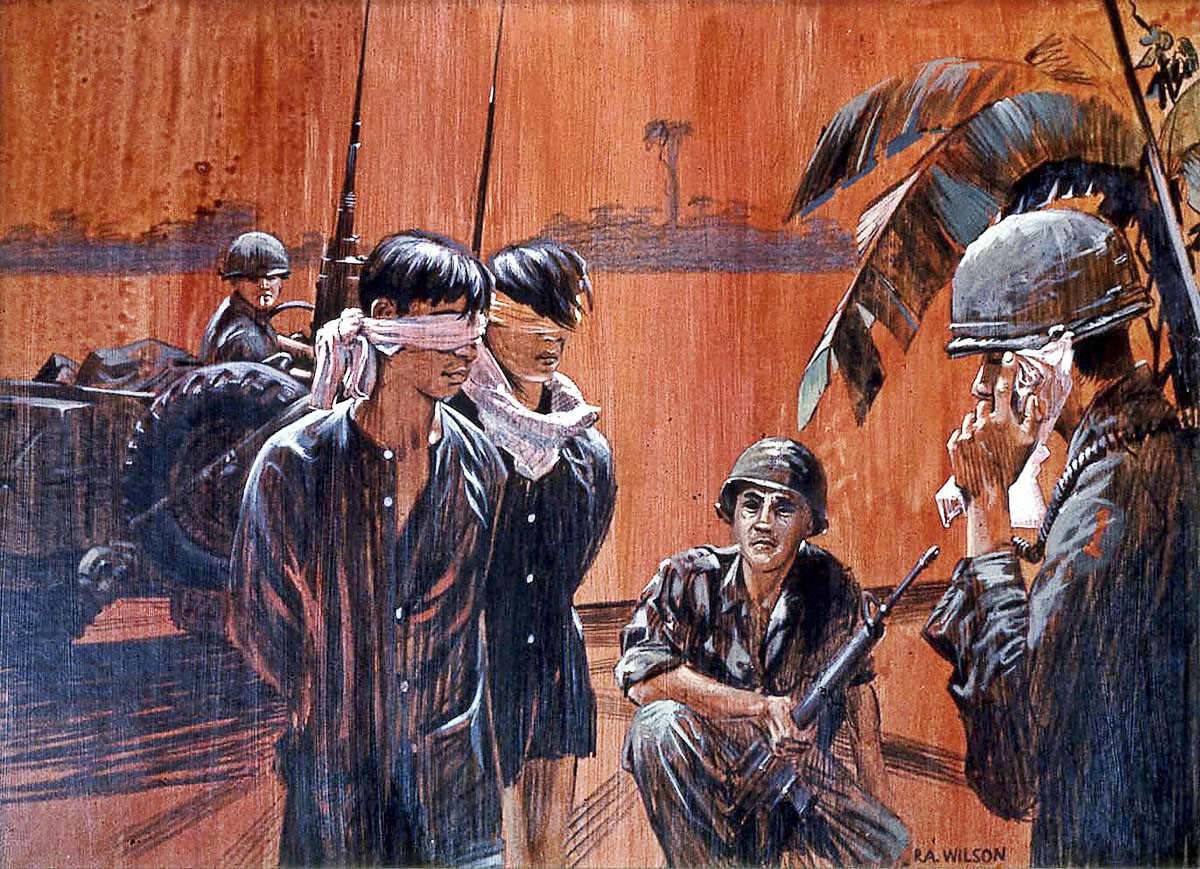
VC by Ronald A. Wilson, CAT IV, 1967

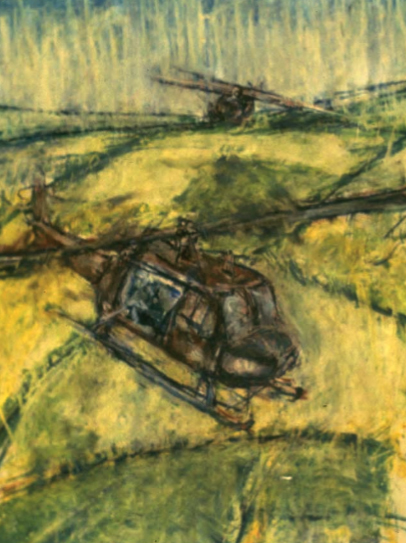
UNTITLED CHOPPERS by James Pollock, CAT IV, 1967

=== CAT V 1 November 1967 to 15 March 1968 ===
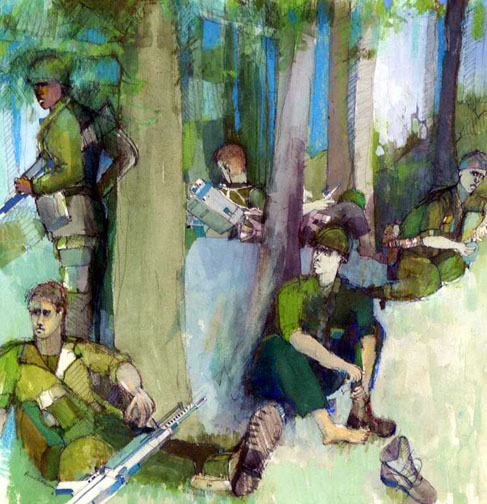
LISTENING by Warren W. Buchanan, CAT V, 1967–68

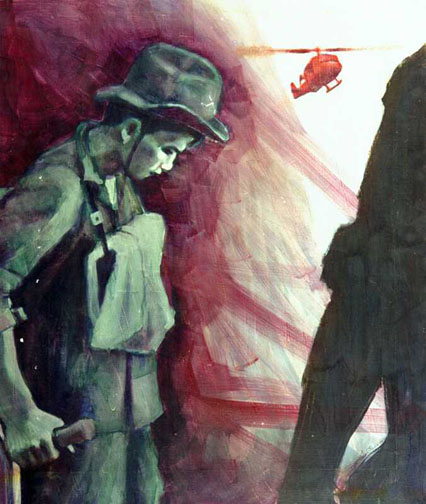
HURT by Philip V. Garner, CAT V, 1967–68

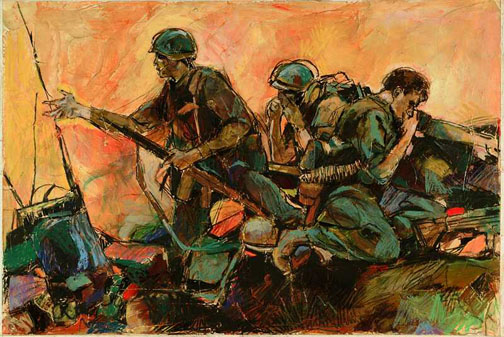
LAST STAND by Phillip W. Jones, CAT V, 1967–68

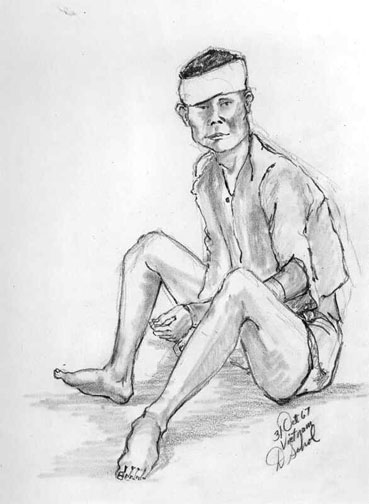
THE ENEMY? by Don R. Schol, CAT V, 1967–68

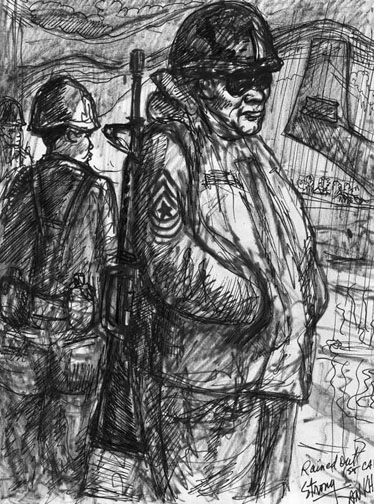
3 WAR MAN by John R. Strong, CAT V, 1967–68

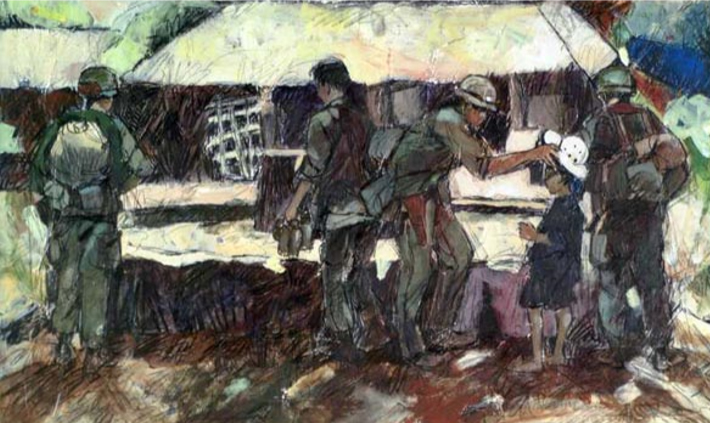
A HAT FOR A LADY by Philip W. Jones, CAT V, 1967–68

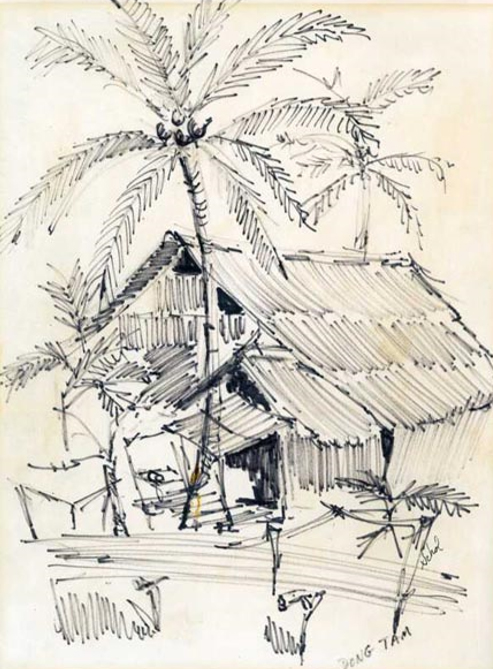
DONG TAM SCENE by Don R. Schol, CAT V, 1967–68

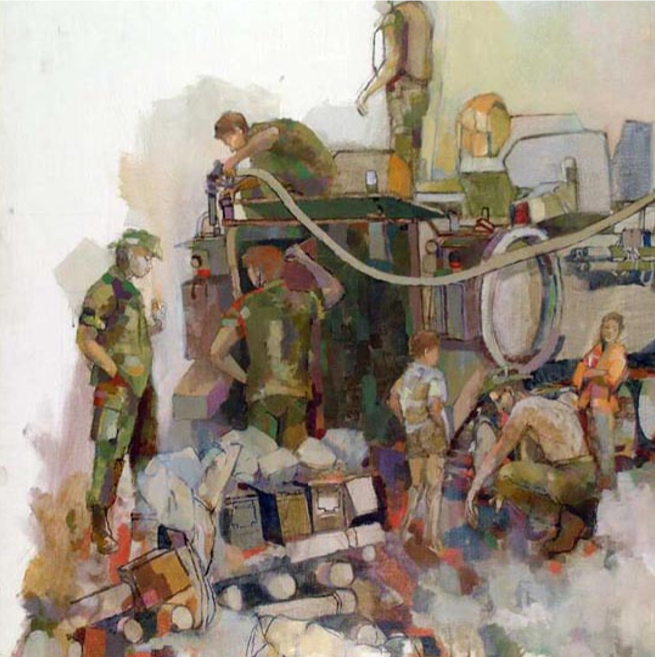
REFUELING by Warren W. Buchanan, CAT V, 1967–68

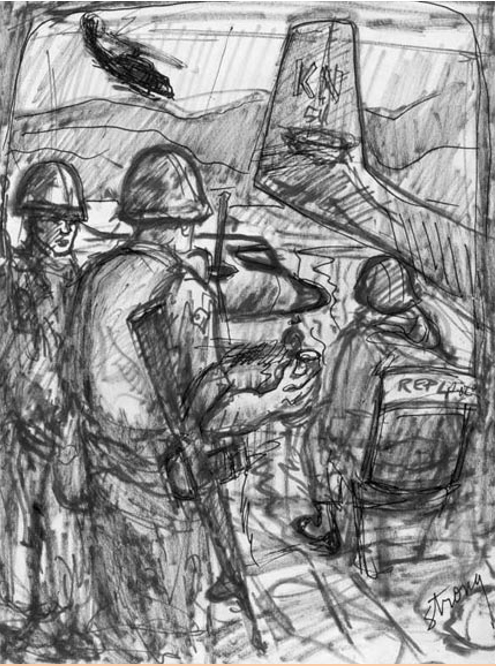
REPLACEMENTS by John R. Strong, CAT V, 1967–68

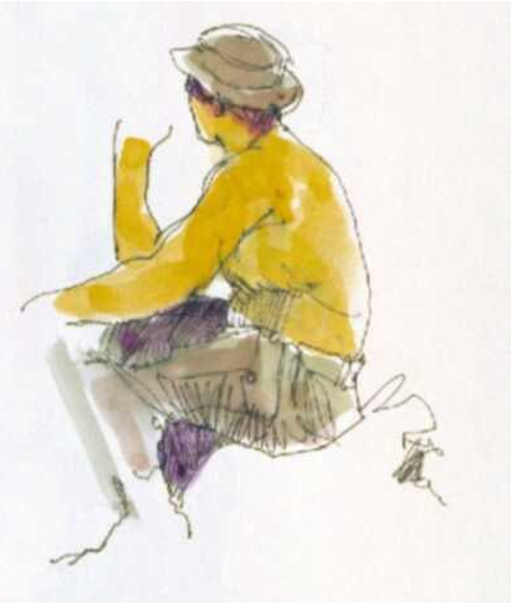
UNTITLED by Philip W. Jones, CAT V, 1967–68

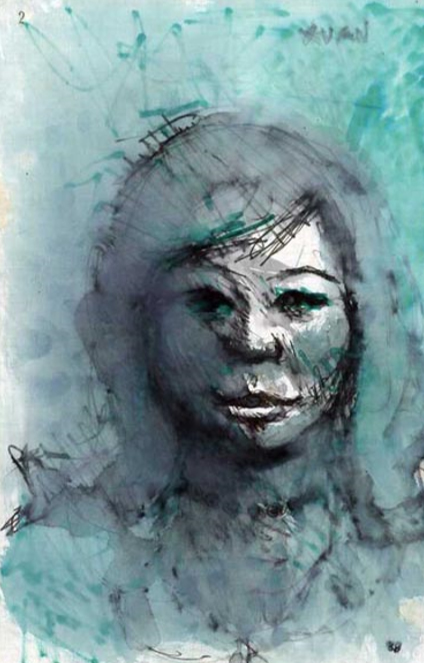
Vietnamese Woman by Philip V. Garner, CAT V, 1967–68

=== CAT VI 1 February 1968 to 15 June 1968 ===
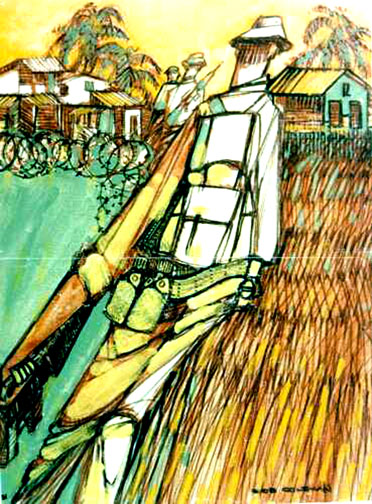
5th SPECIAL FORCES PATROL by Robert T. Coleman, CAT VI, 1968

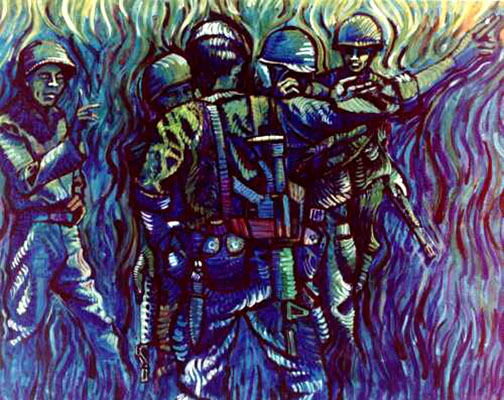
SEARCH FOR AMMO CACHE (11th CAV) by Robert T. Coleman, CAT VI, 1968

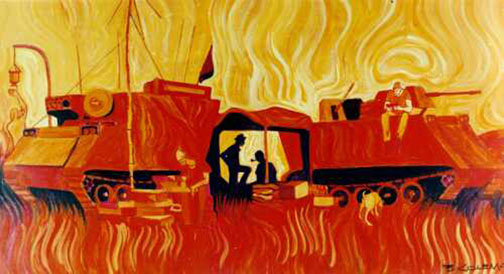
TROOP COMMAND POST by Robert T. Coleman, CAT VI, 1968

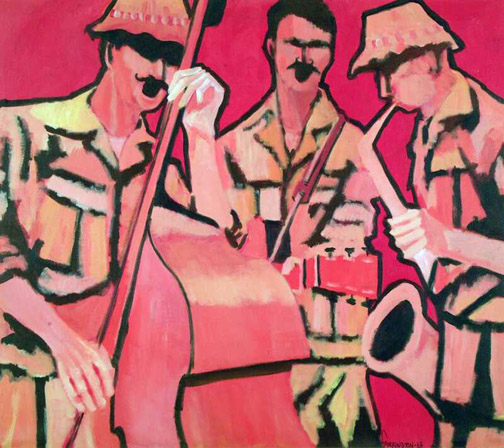
TIME OUT by David N. Fairrington, CAT VI, 1968

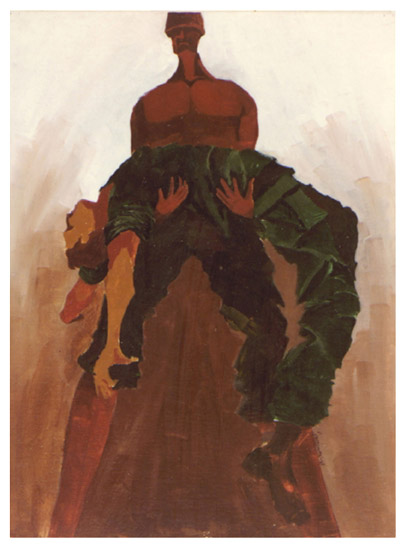
LONG BINH by David N. Fairrington, CAT VI, 1968

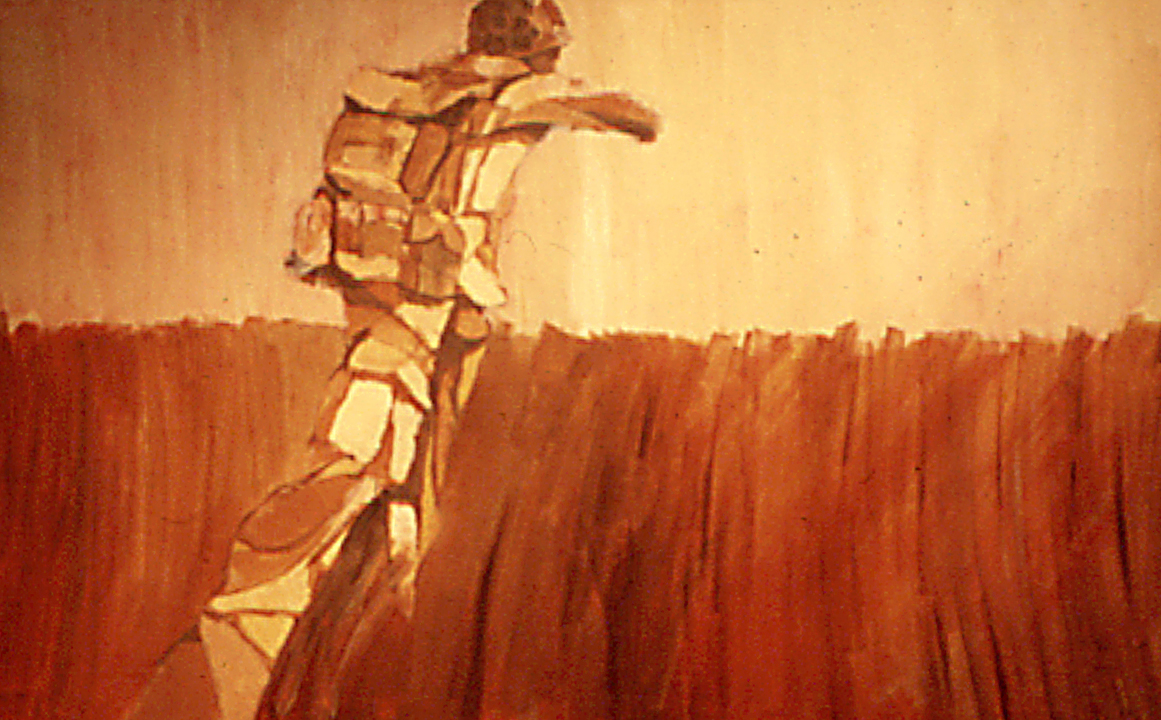
IN THE FIELD by David N. Fairrington, CAT VI, 1968

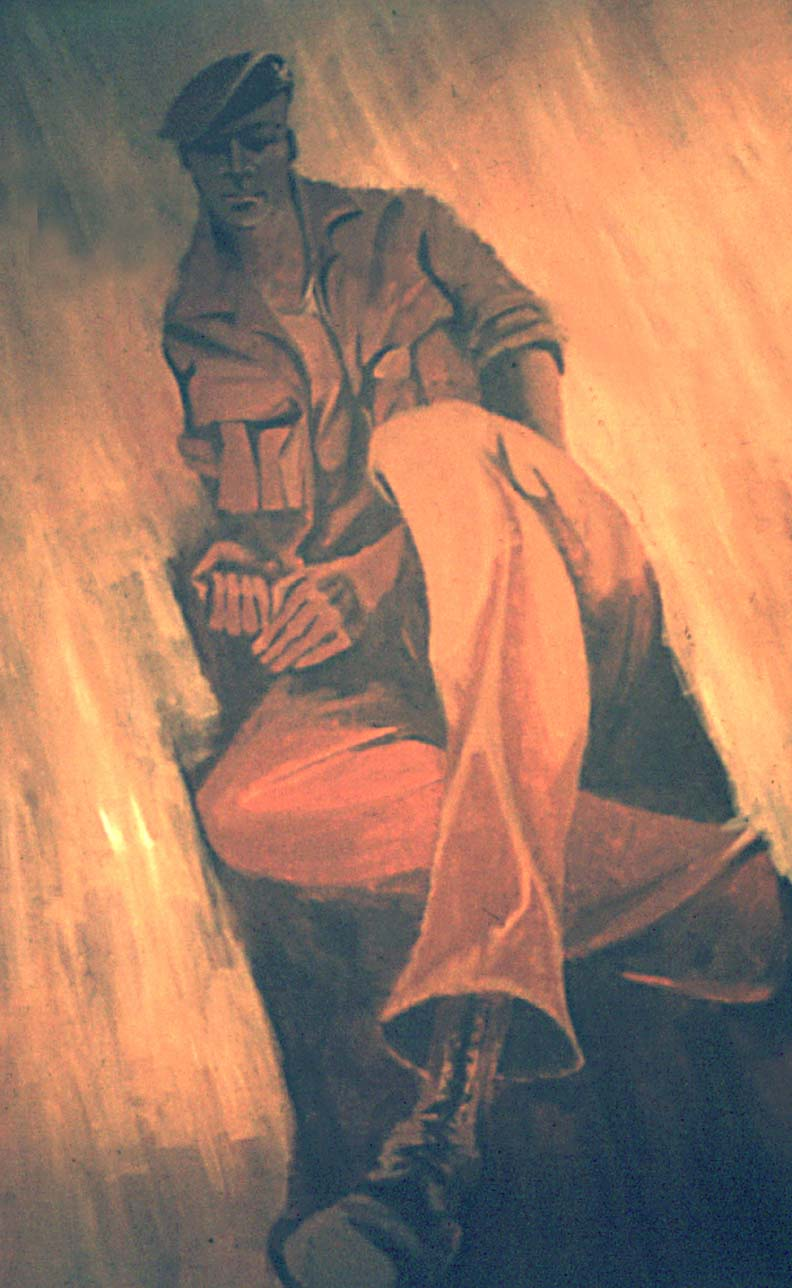
NAVY'S BEST by David N. Fairrington, CAT VI, 1968

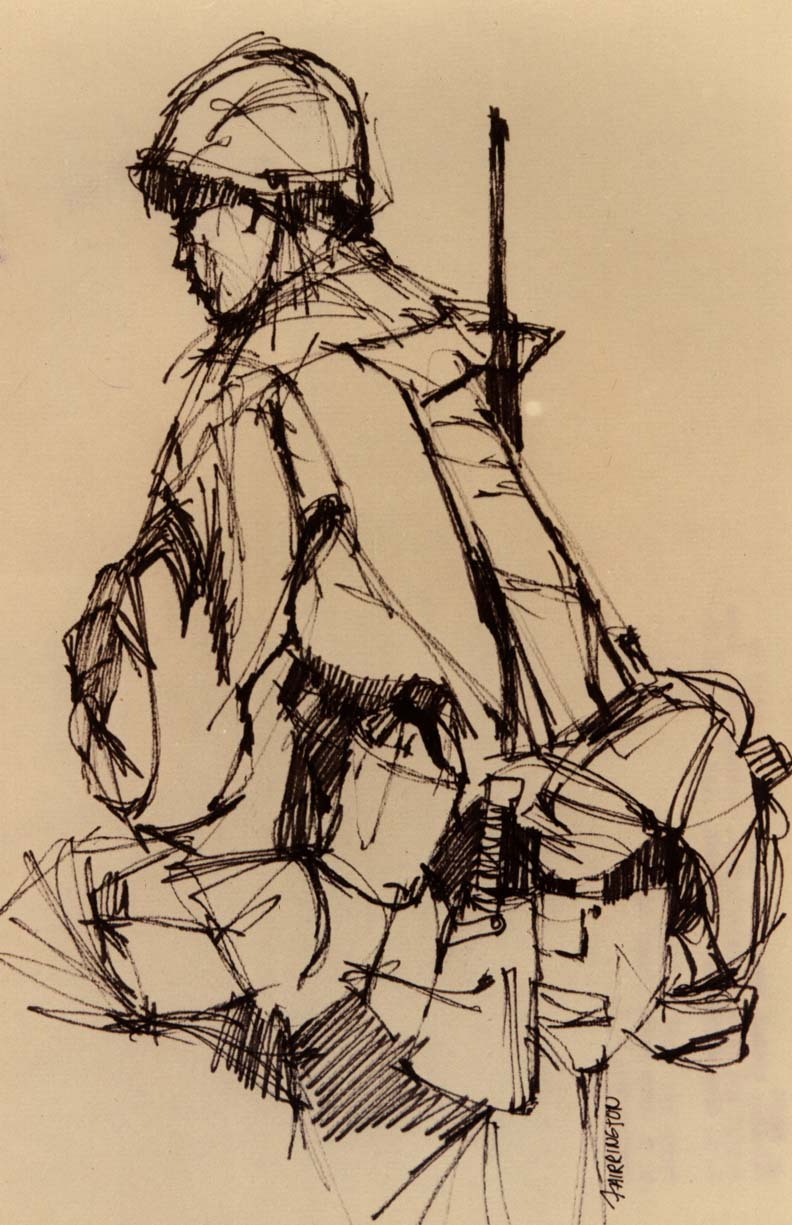
WAITING by David N. Fairrington, CAT VI, 1968

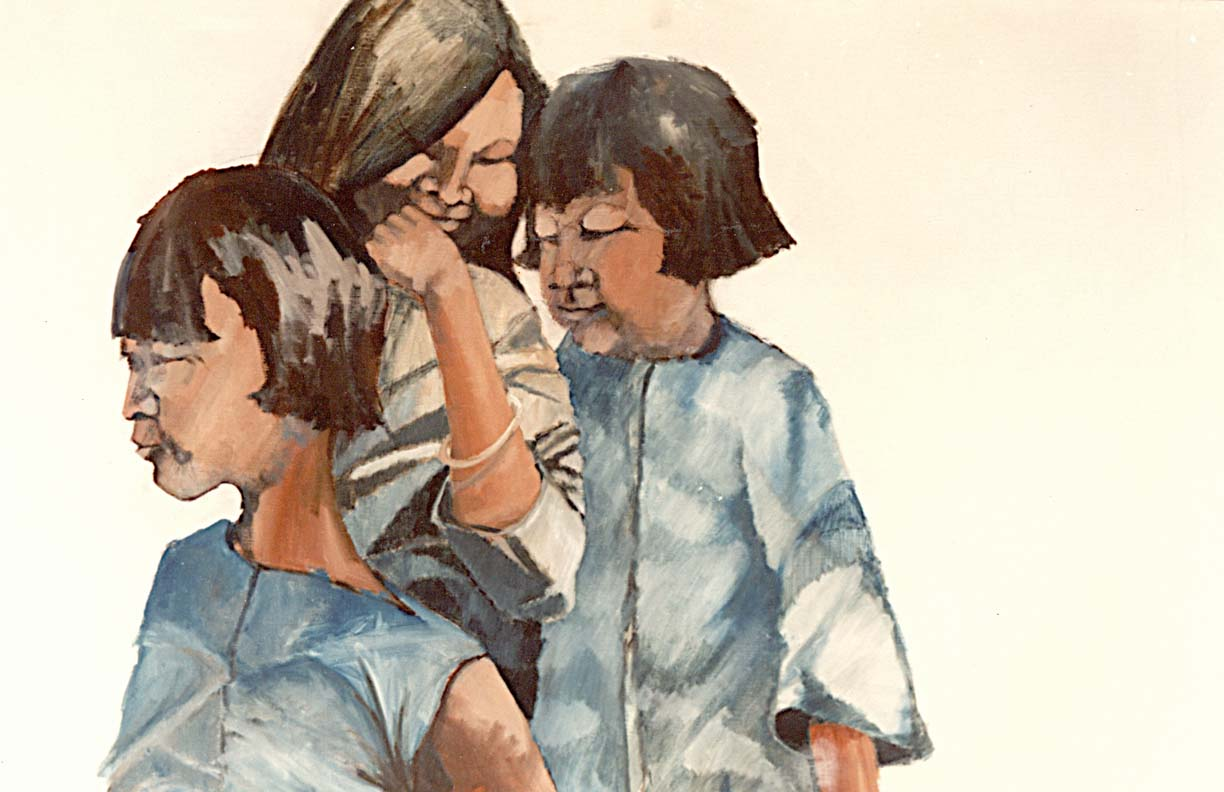
YOUNG GIRLS by David N. Fairrington, CAT VI, 1968

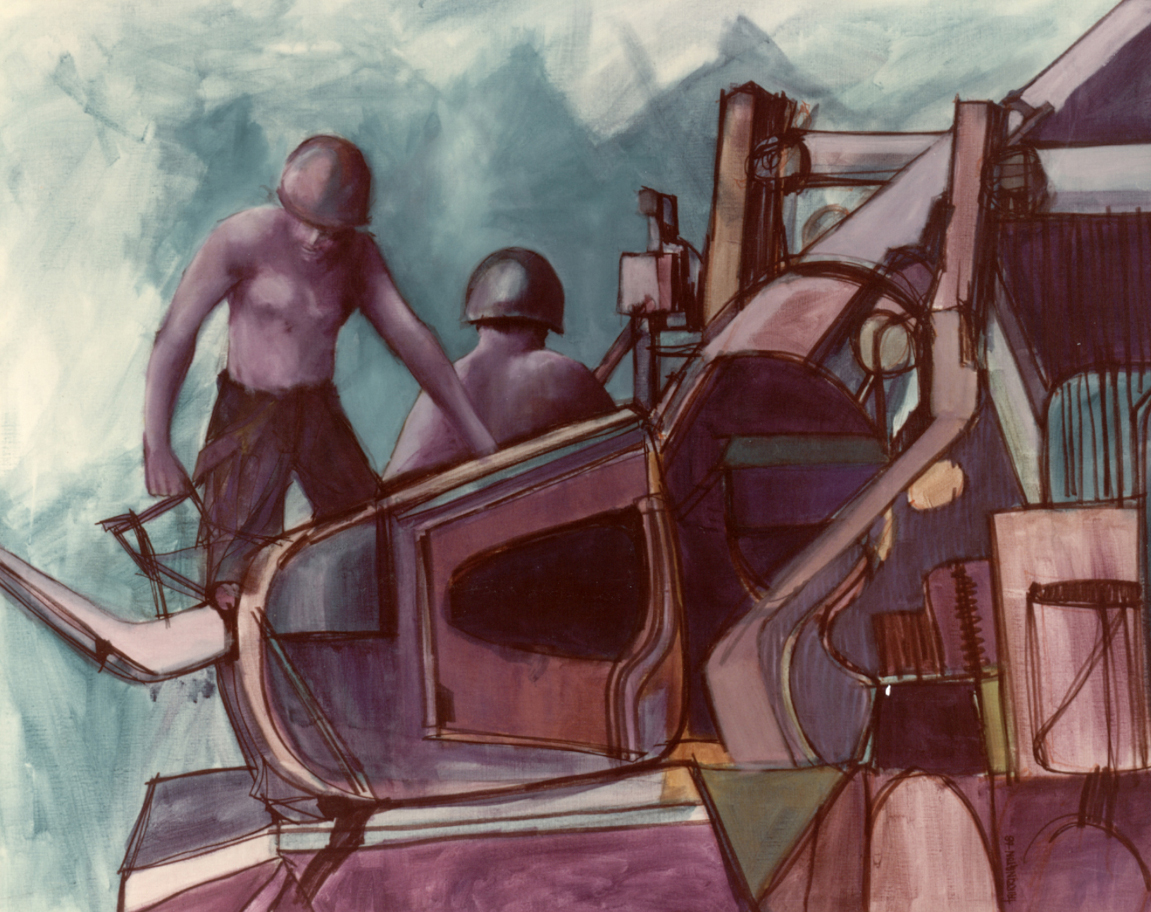
BIG GUNS by David N. Fairrington, CAT VI, 1968

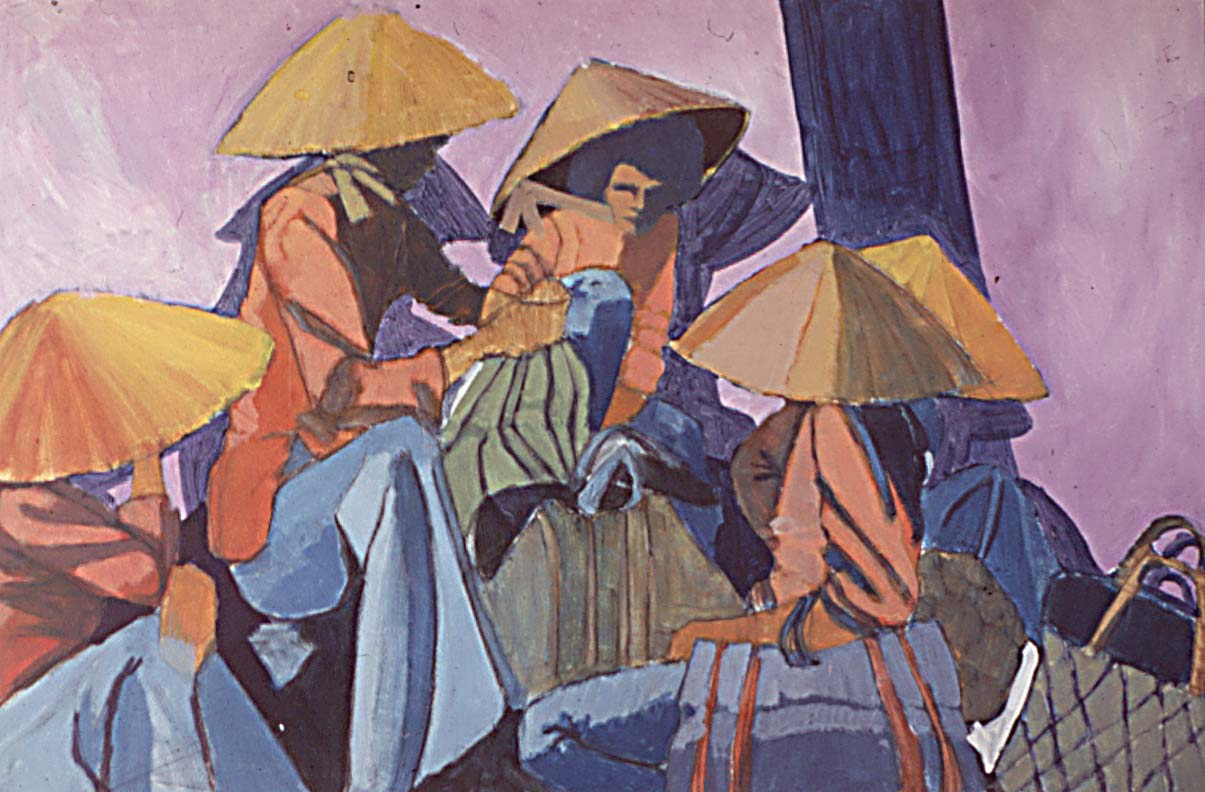
THE LADIES by David N. Fairrington, CAT VI, 1968

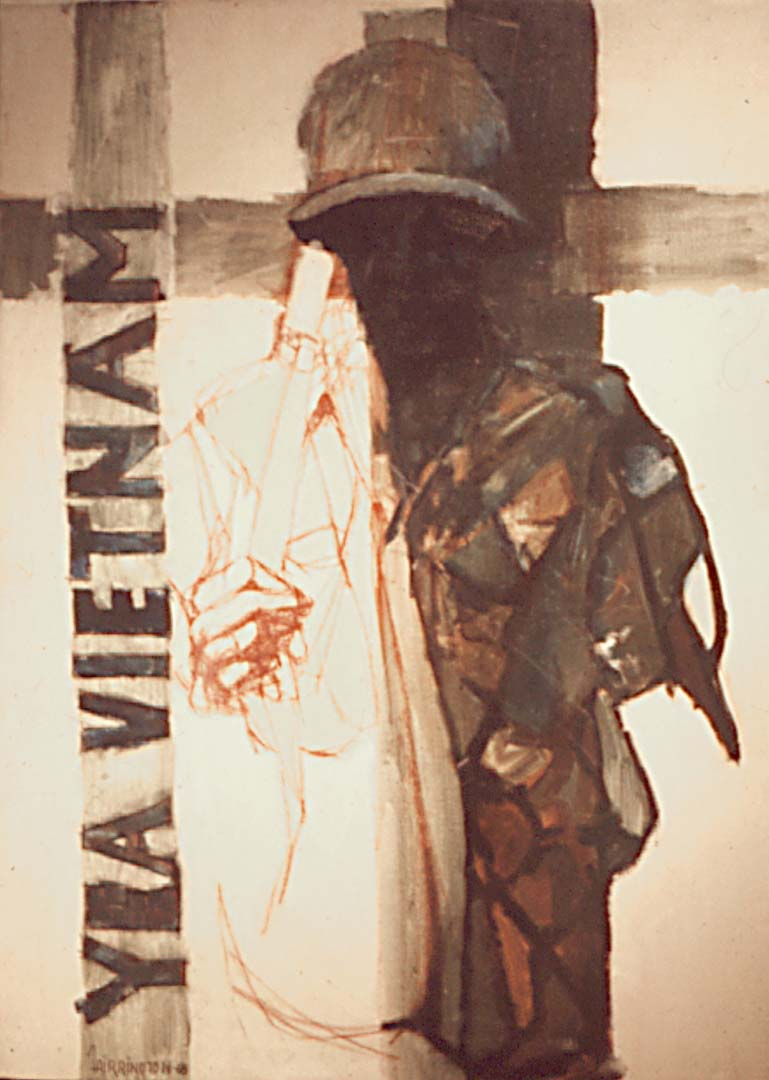
YEA VIETNAM by David N. Fairrington, CAT VI, 1968

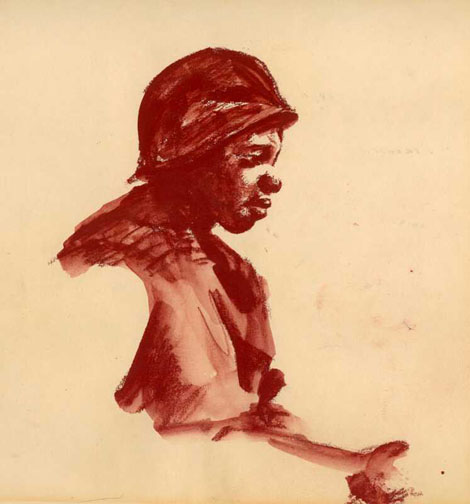
CAVALRY TROOPER by John D. Kurtz IV, CAT VI, 1968

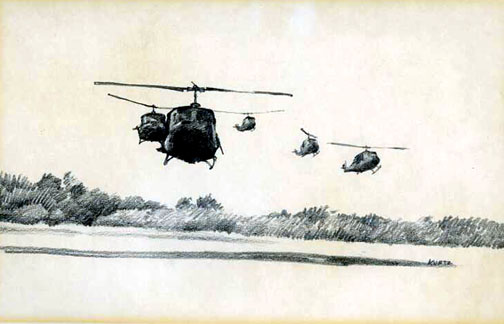
CHOPPERS by John D. Kurtz IV, CAT VI, 1968

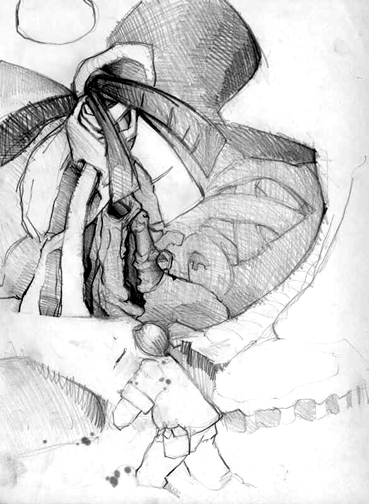
UNTITLED by Kenneth T. McDaniel, CAT VI, 1968

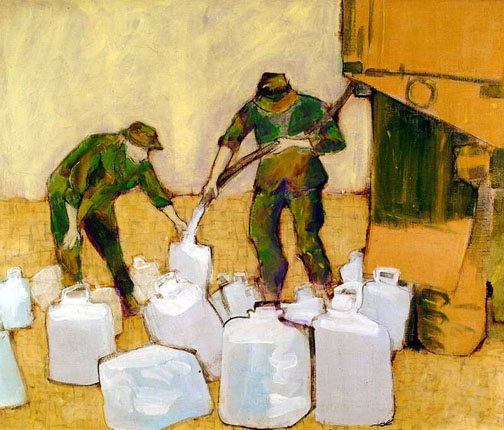
POTABLE WATER by Michael P. Pala, CAT VI, 1968

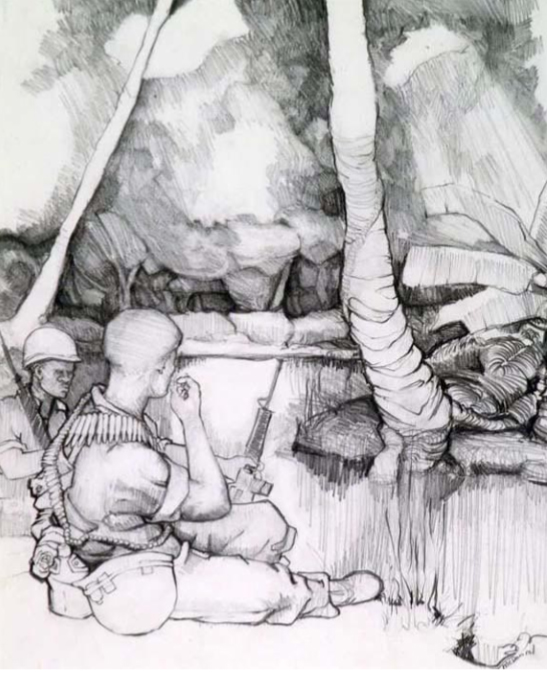
BREAK TIME by Kenneth T. McDaniel, CAT VI, 1968

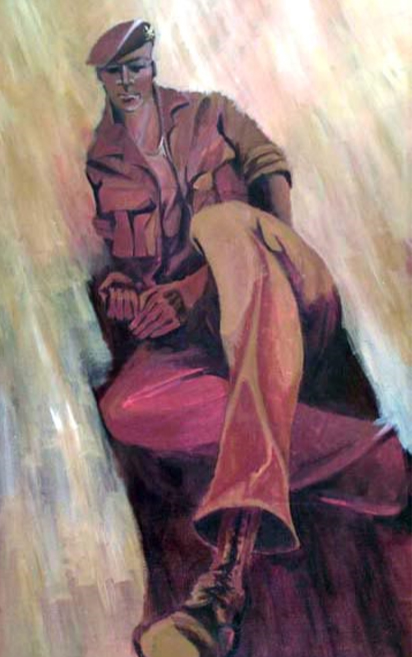
MEMBER OF AIR FORCE SPECIAL TROOPS by David N. Fairrington, CAT VI, 1968

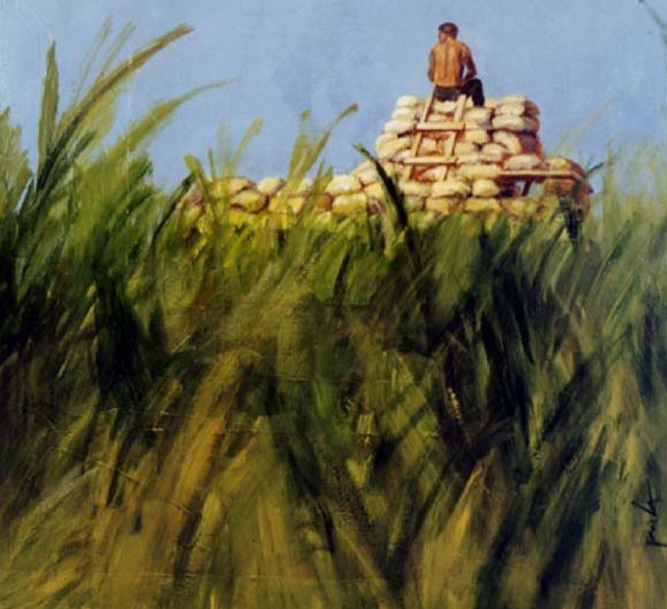
SENTINEL by Michael P. Pala, CAT VI, 1968

=== CAT VII 15 August 1968 to 31 December 1968 ===
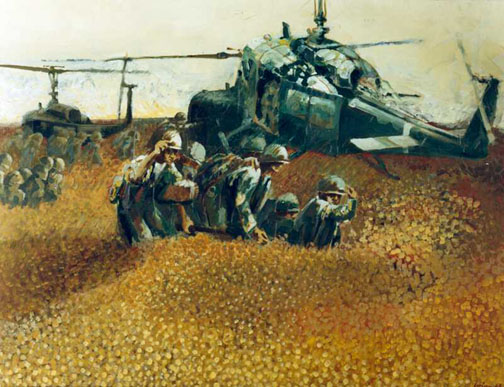
CHOPPER PICK-UP by Brian H. Clark, CAT VII, 1968

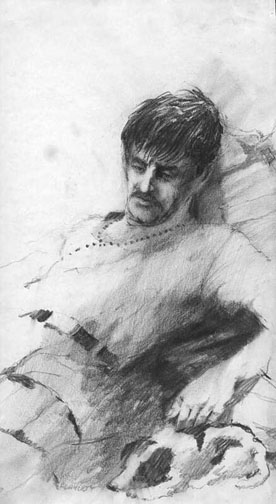
SOLDIER RESTING by William E. Flaherty Jr., CAT VII, 1968

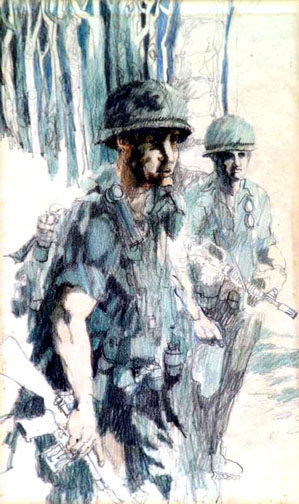
S & D MISSION by William E. Flaherty Jr., CAT VII, 1968

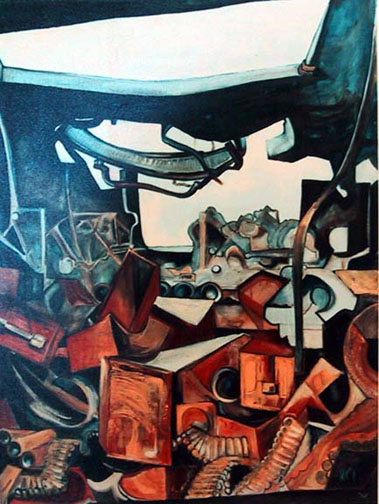
APC-RPG-1 by William C. Harrington, CAT VII, 1968

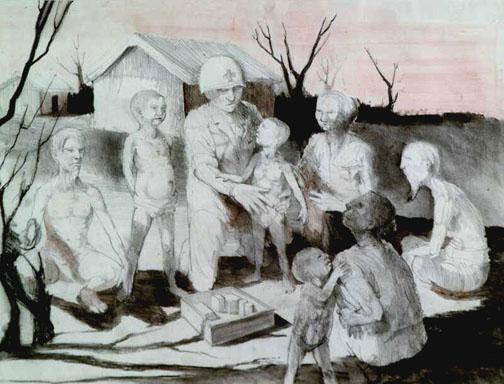
MEDCAP by Barry W. Johnston, CAT VII, 1968

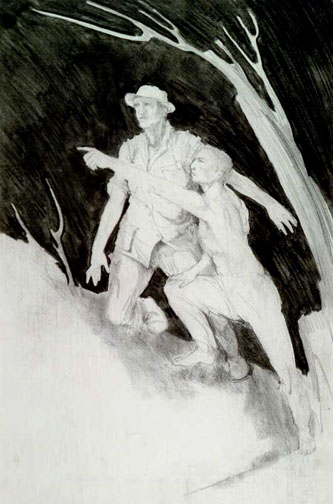
500 METERS TO THE FRONT by Barry W. Johnston, CAT VII, 1968

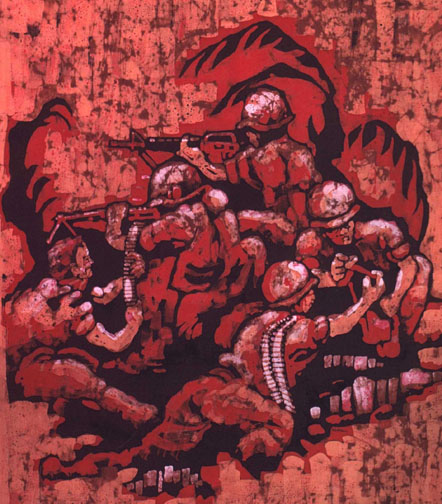
FIREFIGHT by Stephen H. Randall, CAT VII, 1968

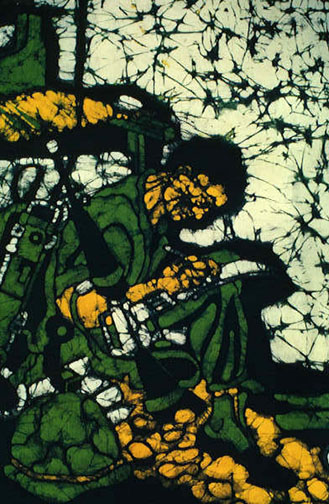
LETTER TO HOME by Stephen H. Randall, CAT VII, 1968

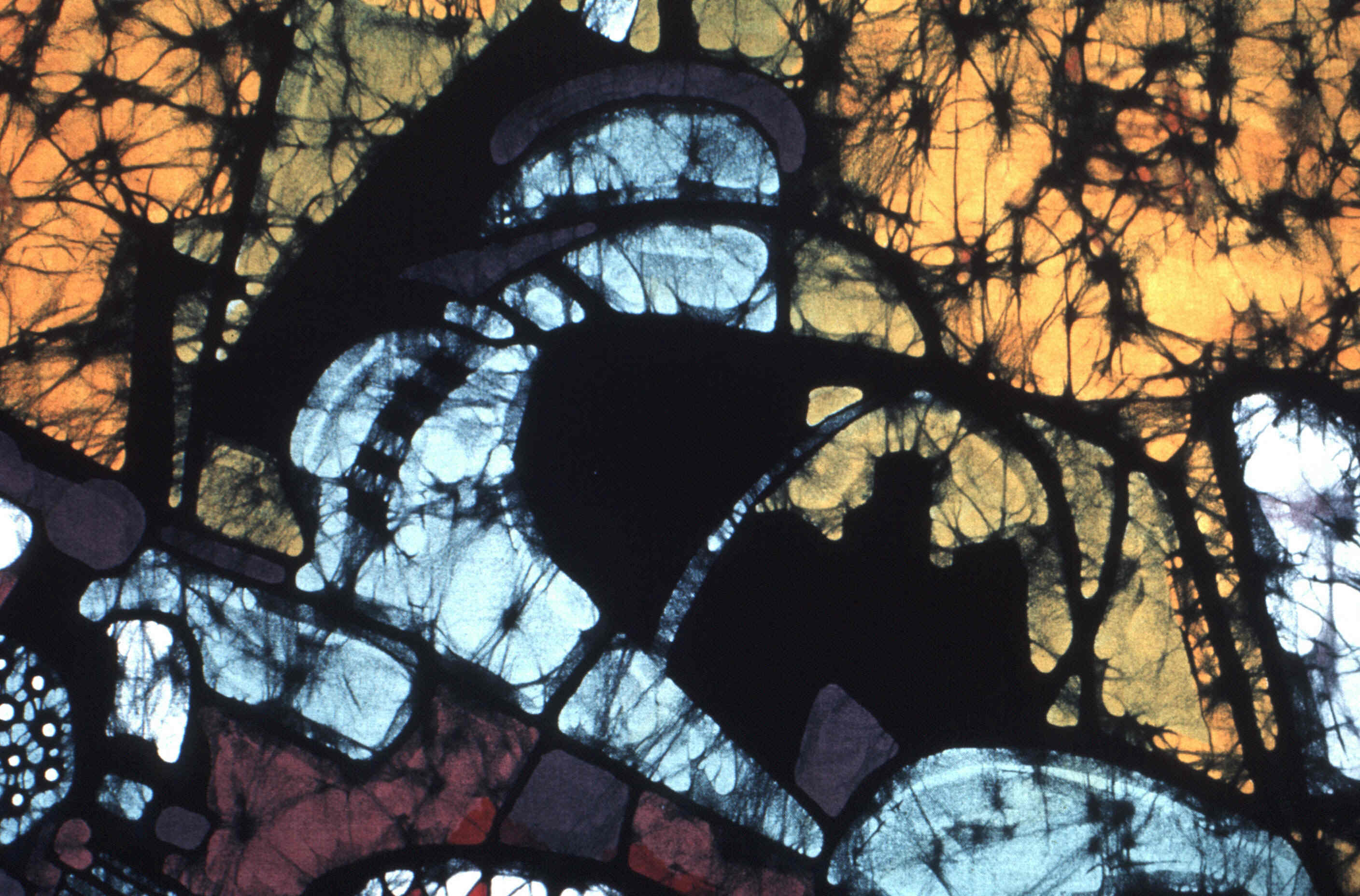
COBRA by Stephen H. Randall, CAT VII, 1968

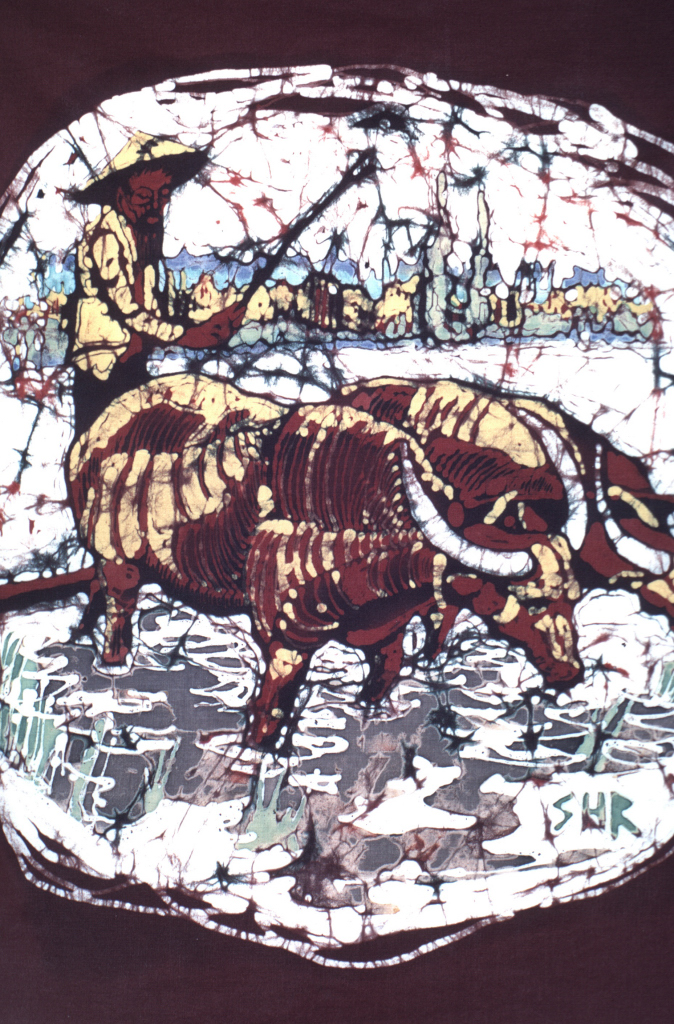
HARD LABOR by Stephen H. Randall, CAT VII, 1968

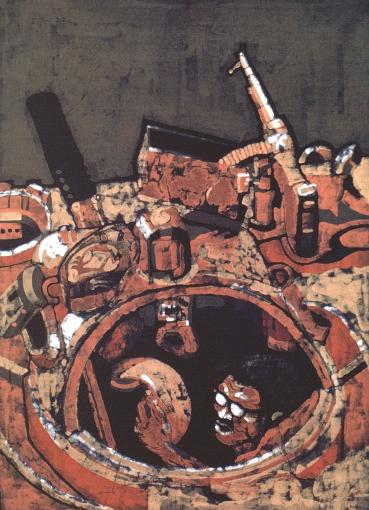
FLAMER by Stephen H. Randall, CAT VII, 1968

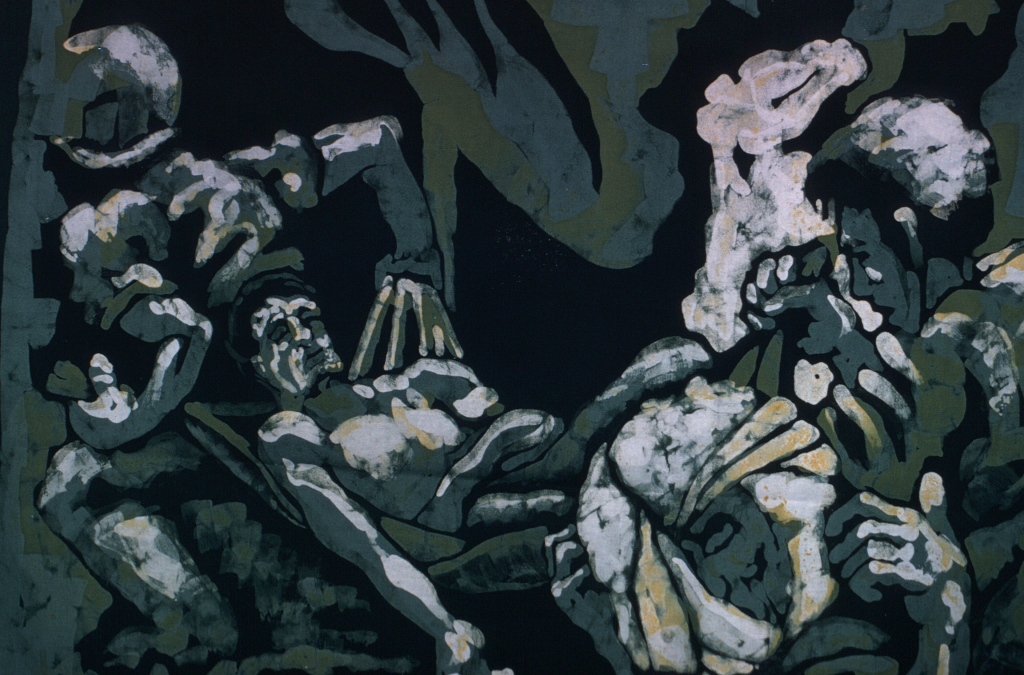
GET THEM OUT by Stephen H. Randall, CAT VII, 1968

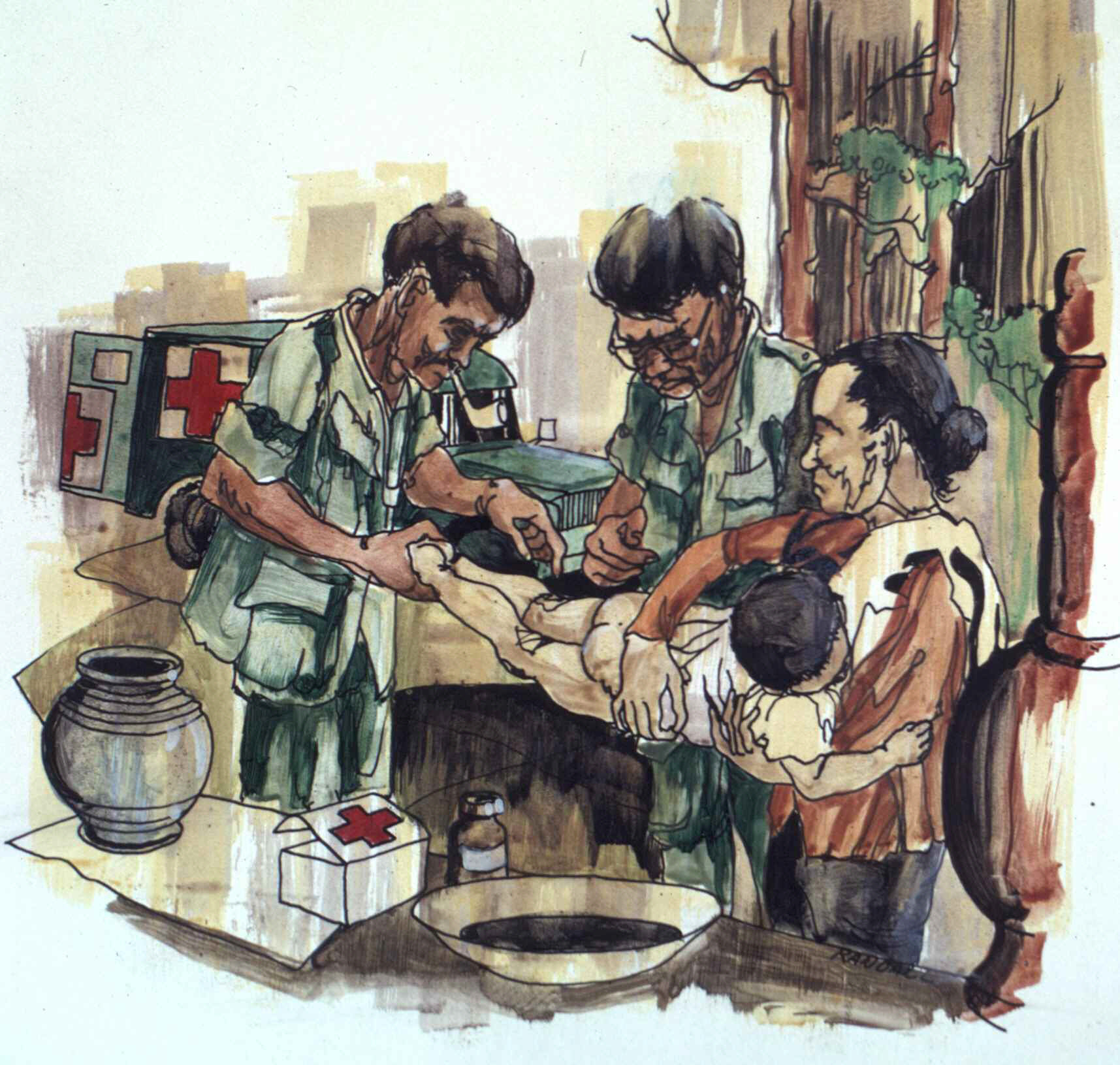
I SEE IT by Stephen H. Randall, CAT VII, 1968

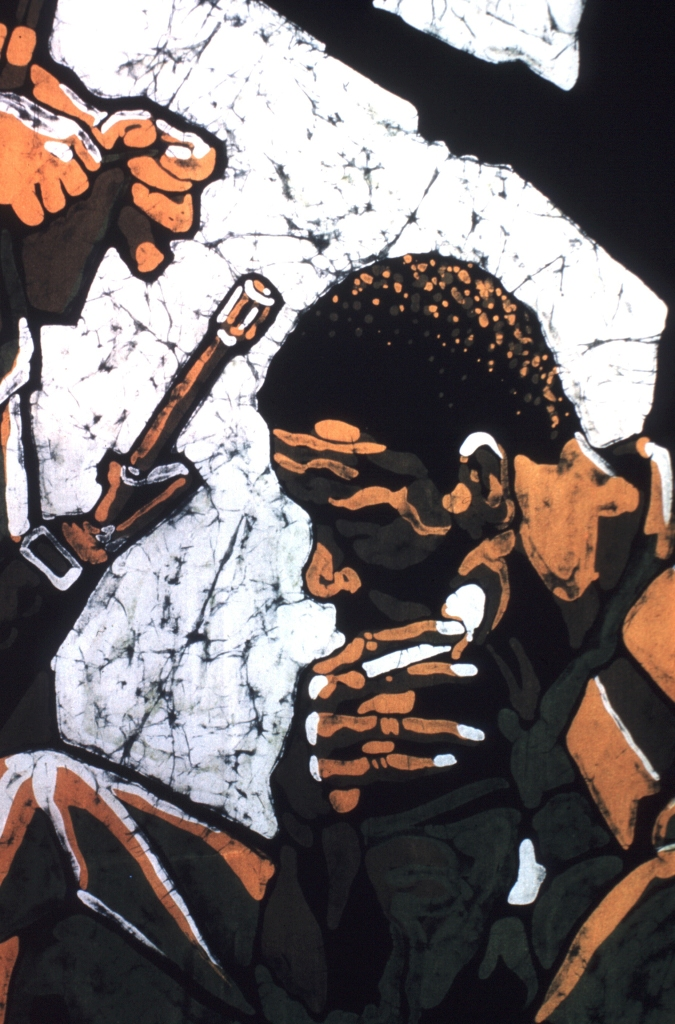
SOLDIERS by Stephen H. Randall, CAT VII, 1968

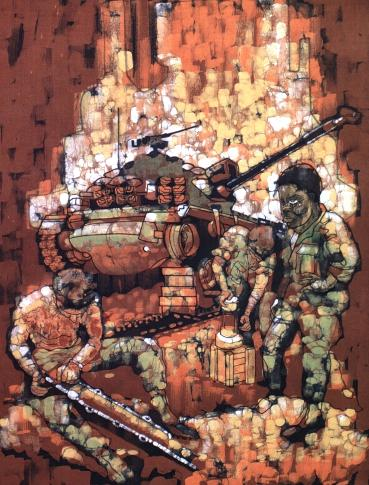
TANK by Stephen H. Randall, CAT VII, 1968

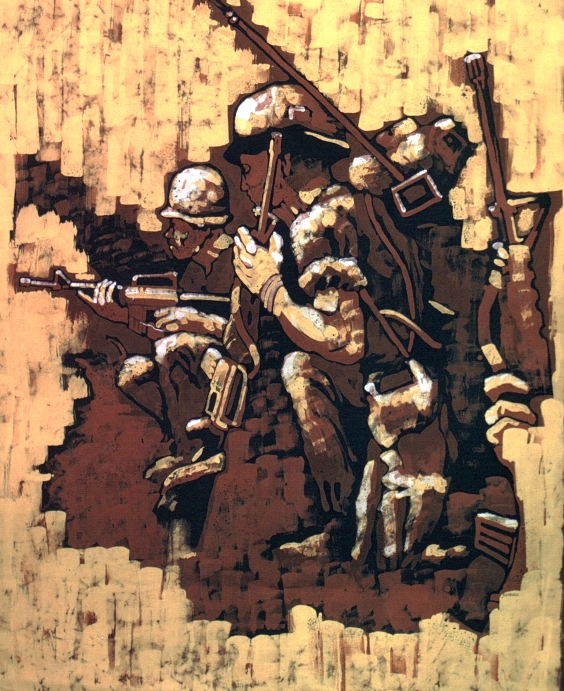
SILENT SWEAT by Stephen H. Randall, CAT VII, 1968

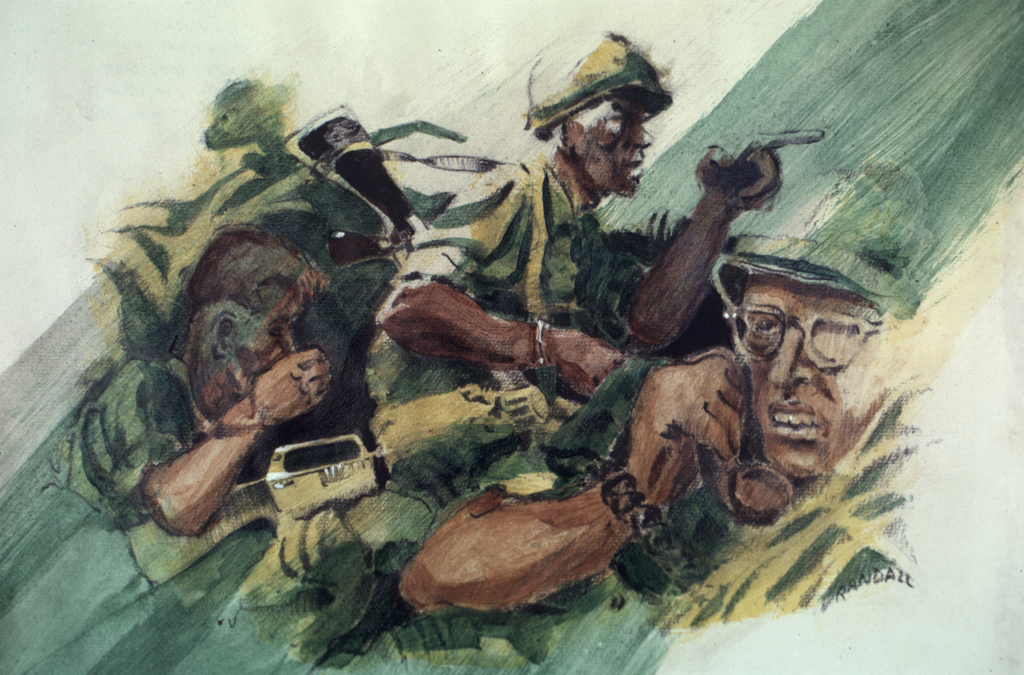
OVER THERE by Stephen H. Randall, CAT VII, 1968

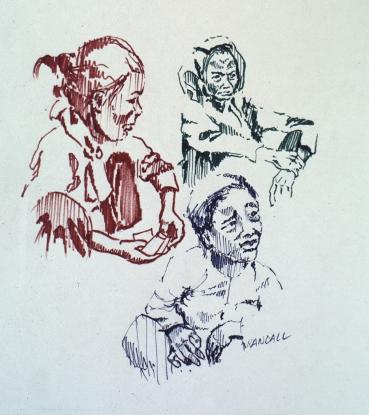
FIGURE STUDY by Stephen H. Randall, CAT VII, 1968

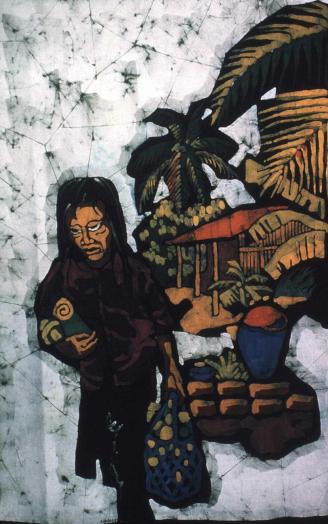
EARLY MORNING by Stephen H. Randall, CAT VII, 1968

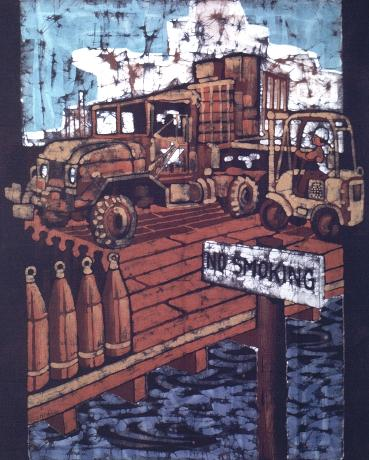
DOCK OF THE BAY by Stephen H. Randall, CAT VII, 1968

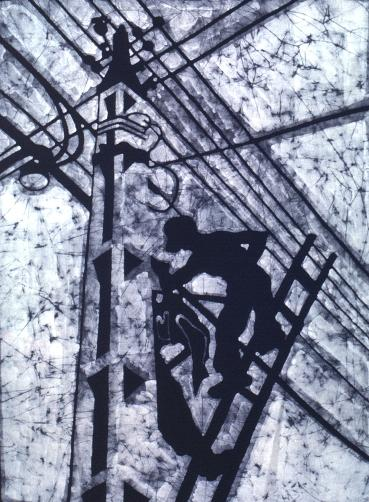
COMMUNICATION by Stephen H. Randall, CAT VII, 1968

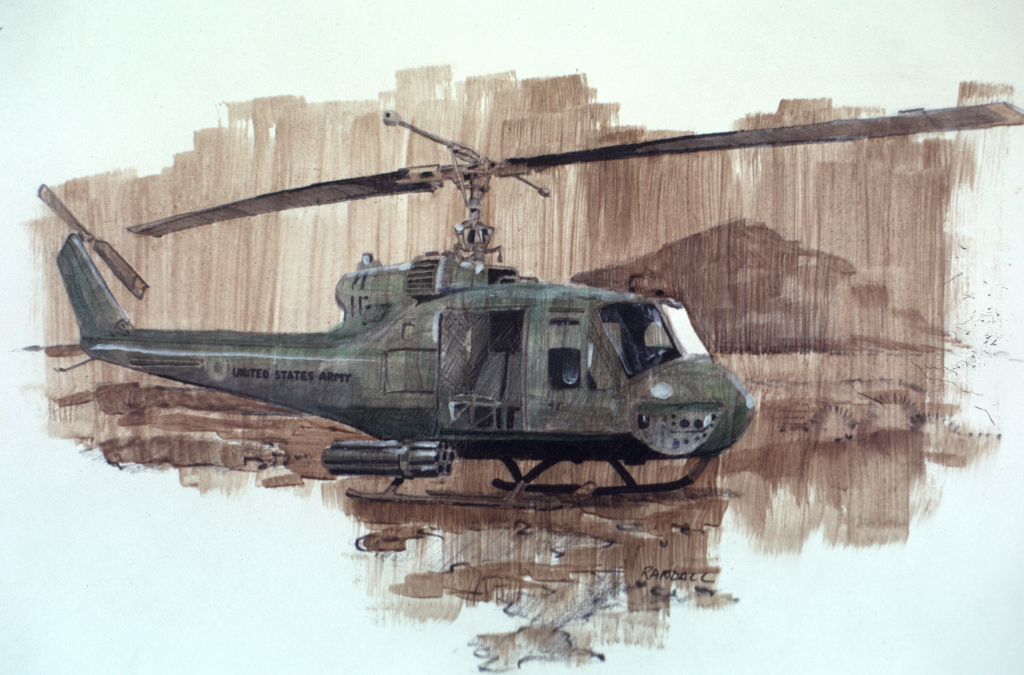
MOUNTAIN CLIMBER by Stephen H. Randall, CAT VII, 1968

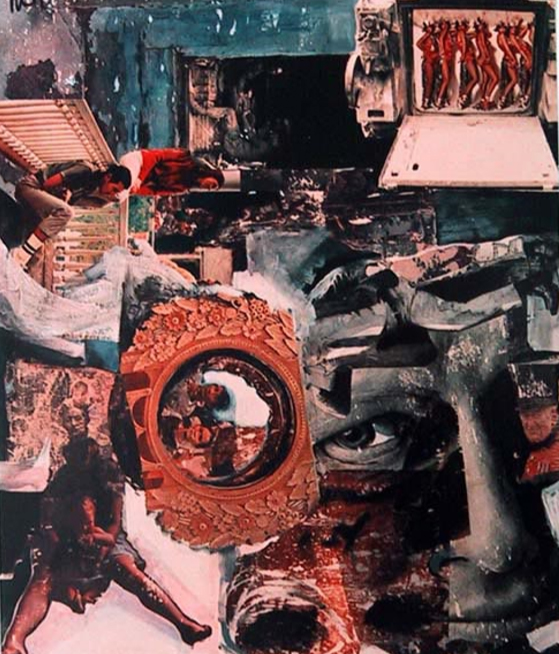
AMERICAN GOTHIC by William C. Harrington, CATVII, 1968

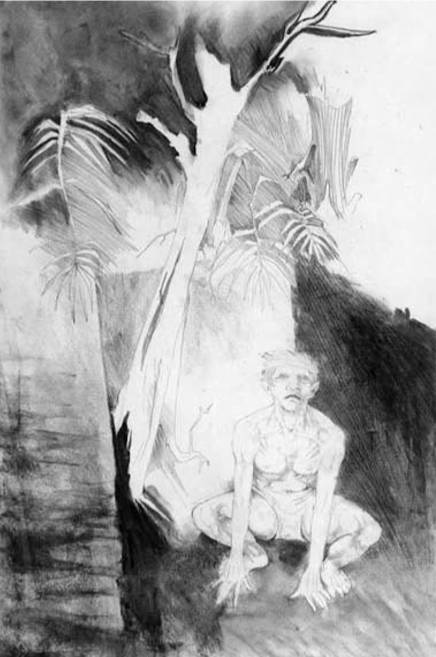
CAPTIVE by Barry W. Johnston, CAT VII, 1968

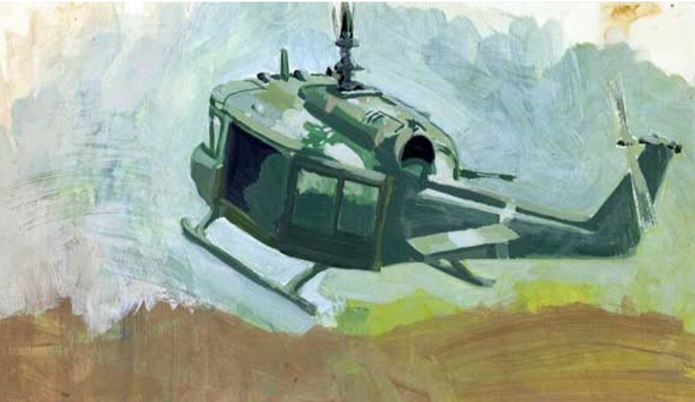
DUST OFF ALOFT by Brian H. Clark, CAT VII, 1968

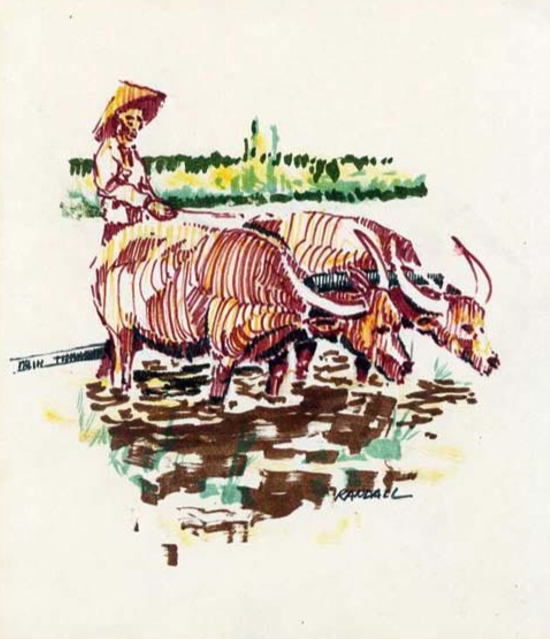
HARD LABOR IN A RICE PADDY by Stephen H. Randall, CAT VII, 1968

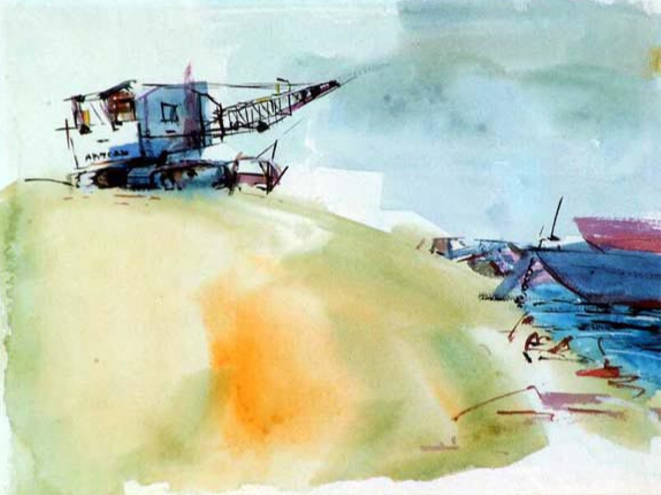
LOADING DOCK by Unknown Artist, CAT VII, 1968

=== CAT VIII 1 February 1969 to 15 June 1969 ===
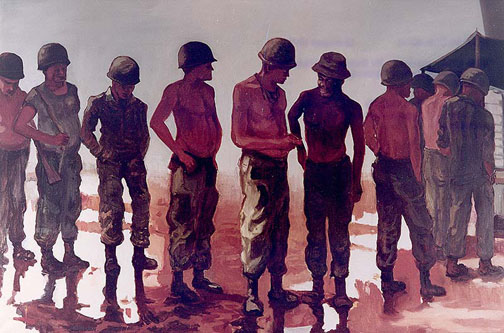
CAMP IN AMERICAN DIVISION by Edward J. Bowen, CAT VIII, 1969

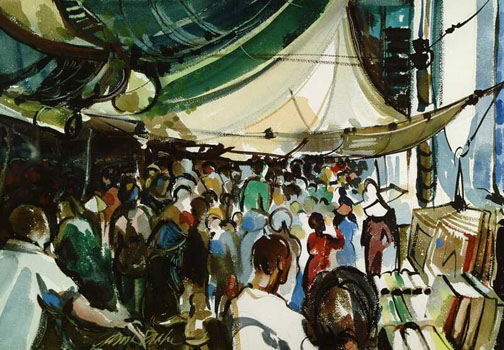
SATURDAY UPTOWN by James R. Drake, CAT VIII, 1969

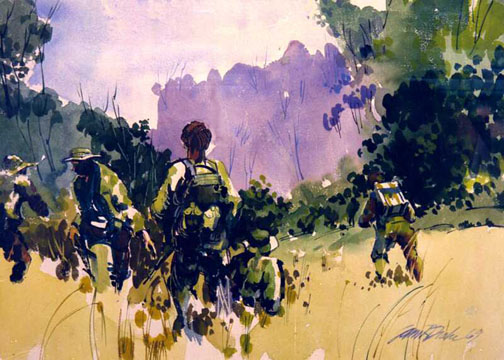
LONG RANGE PATROL by James R. Drake, CAT VIII, 1969

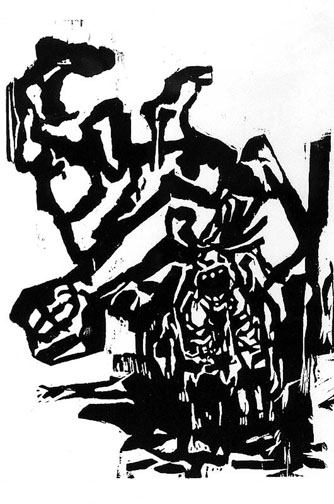
BODY COUNT No. 5 by Roman Rakowskky, CAT VIII, 1969

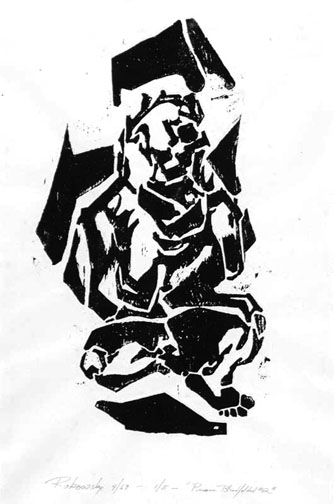
PRISONER BLINDFOLDED by Roman Rakowsky, CAT VIII, 1969

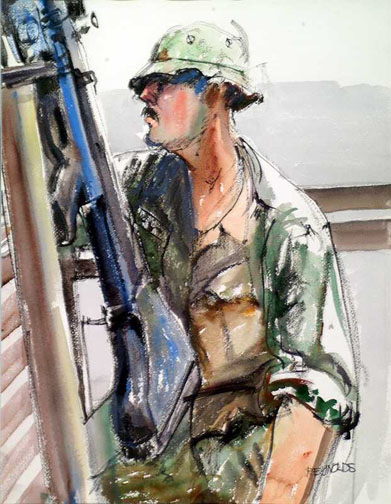
COMBAT ENGINEER by Victory V. Reynolds, CAT VIII, 1969

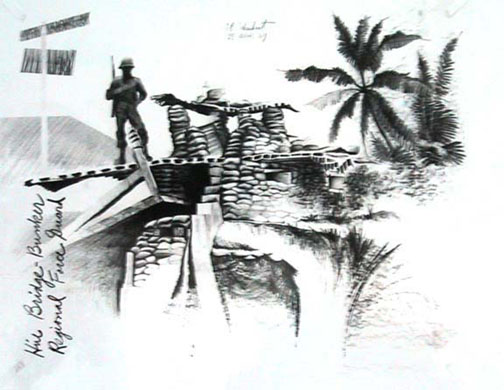
BRIDGE BUNKER WITH GUARD by Thomas B. Schubert, CAT VIII, 1969

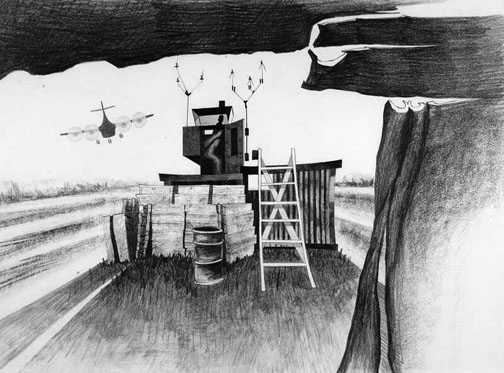
DAN TIENG OBSERVATION TOWER by Thomas B. Schubert, CAT VIII, 1969

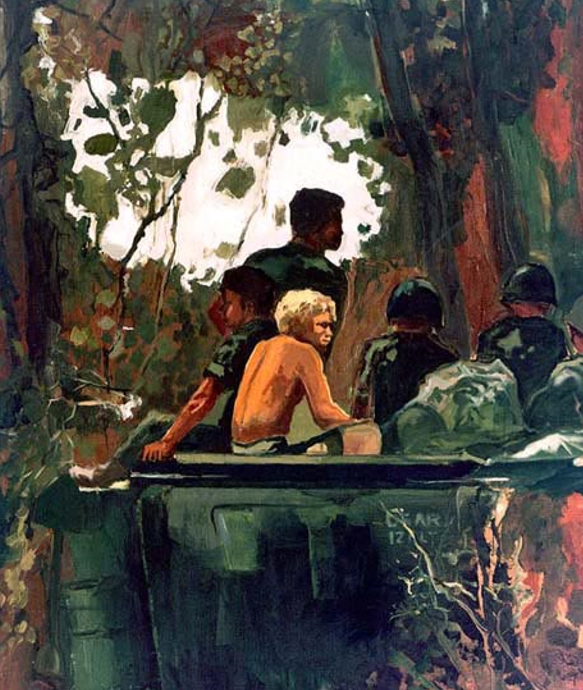
APC by Edward J. Bowen, CATVIII, 1969

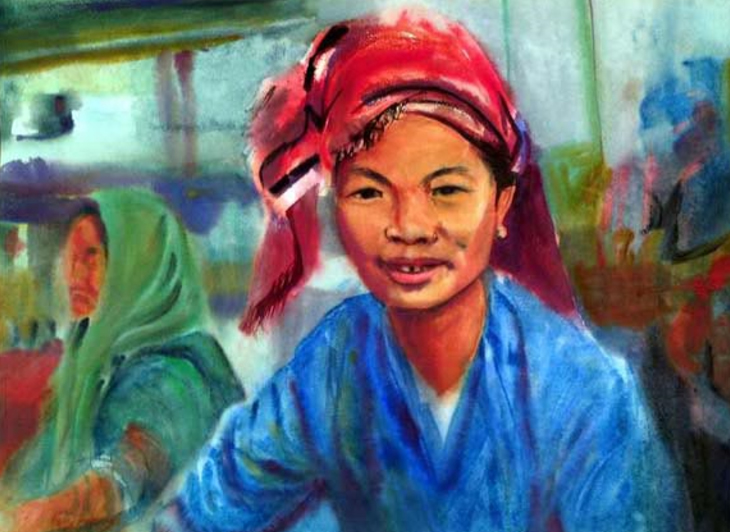
MARKET PLACE by Victory V. Reynolds, CAT VIII, 1969

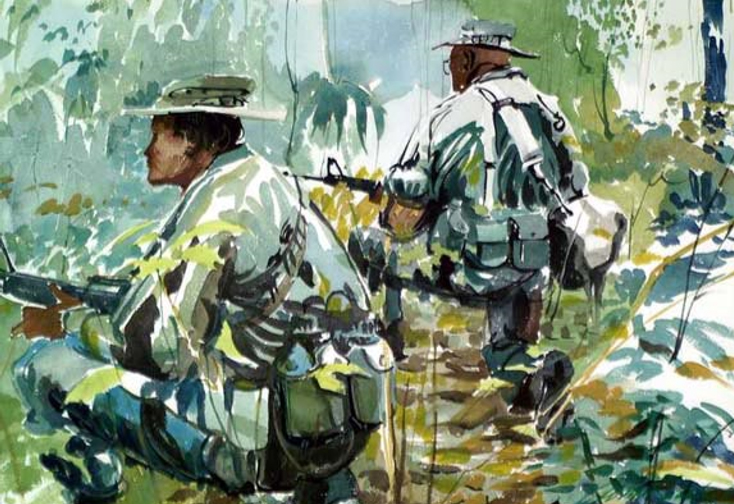
ON A LONG RANGE PATROL by James R. Drake, CAT VIII, 1969

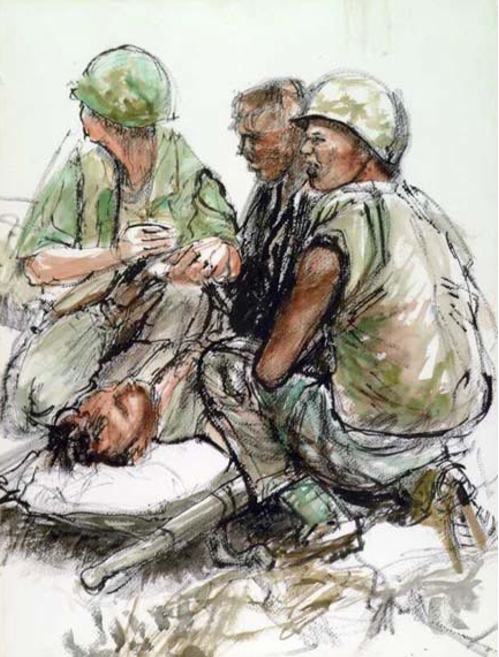
WAITING by Victory V. Reynolds, CAT VIII, 1969

=== CAT IX 1 September 1969 to 14 January 1970 ===
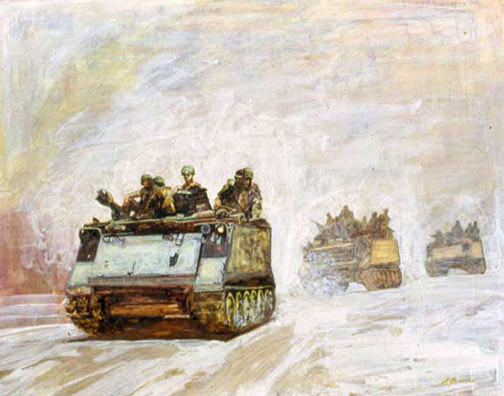
APC by David E. Graves, CAT IX, 1969–70

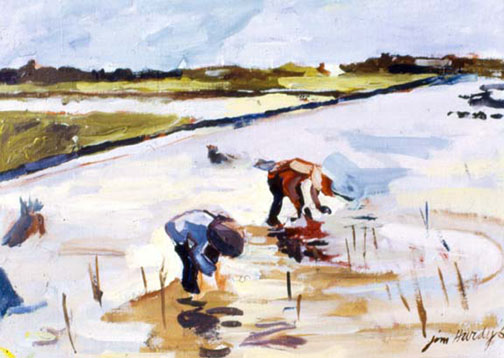
RICE PADDY by James S. Hardy, CAT IX, 1969–70

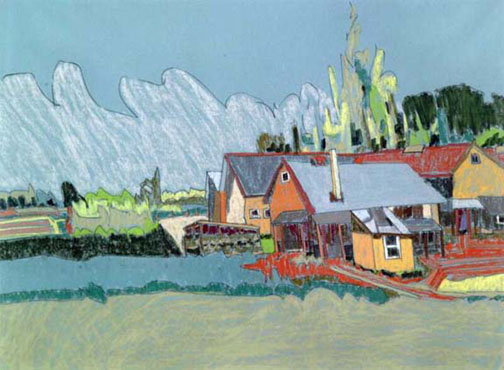
RICE MILL, MY THO by William R. Hoettels, CAT IX, 1969–70

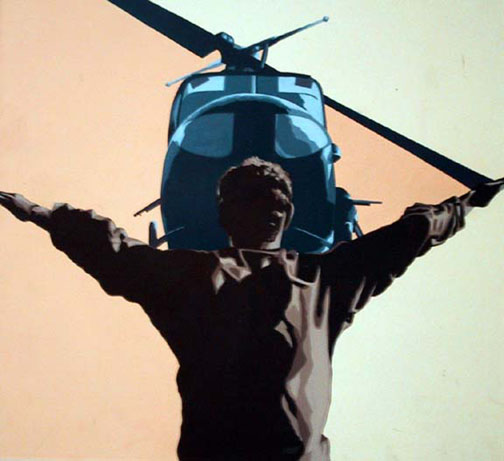
GROUND GUIDE by Bruce N. Rigby, CAT IX, 1969–70

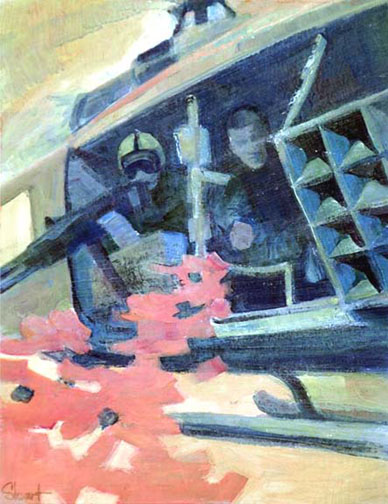
CHIEU HOI MISSION by Craig L. Stewart, CAT IX, 1969–70

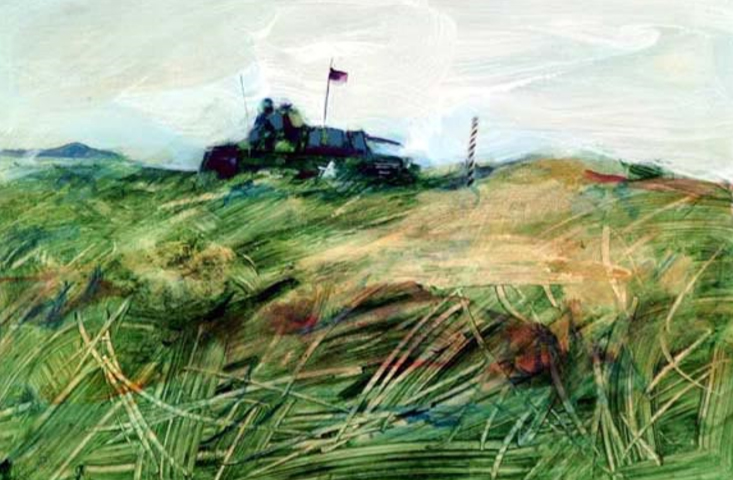
APC ON THE DMZ by James S. Hardy, CAT IX, 1969–70

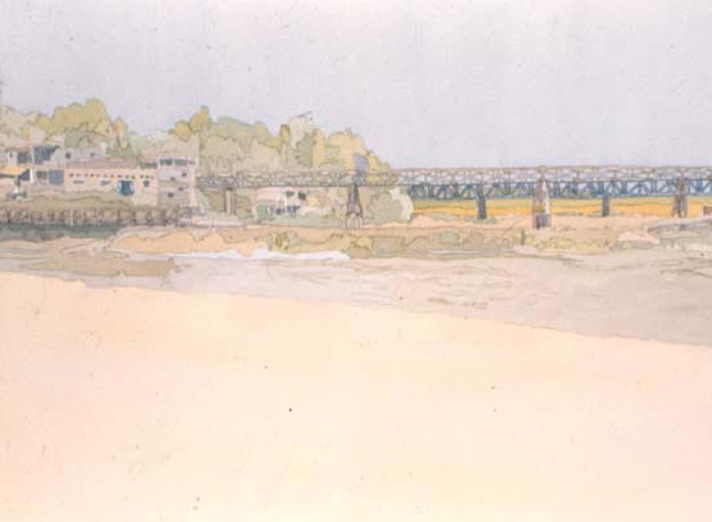
BIEN DIEN BRIDGE by William R. Hoettels, CAT IX, 1969–70

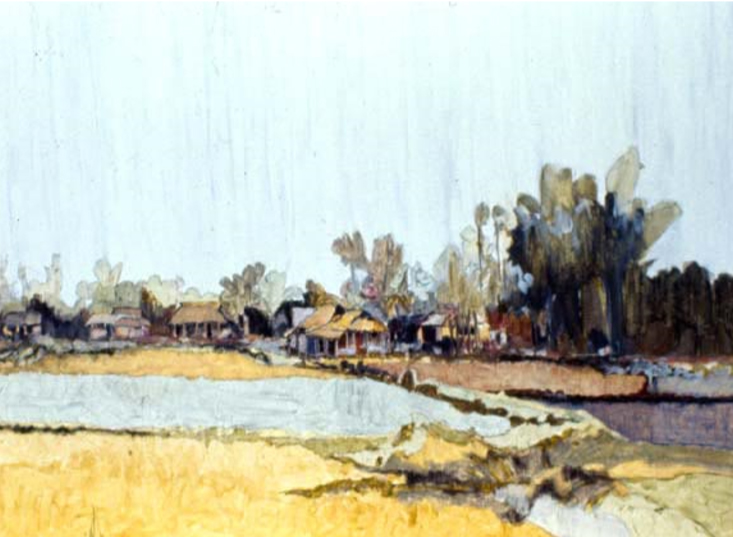
DELTA VILLAGE by William R. Hoettels, CAT IX, 1969–70

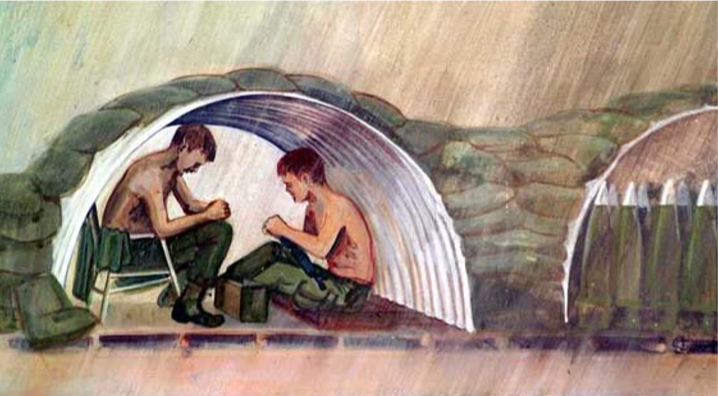
FIREBASE RENDEZVOUS by Craig L. Stewart, CAT IX, 1969–70

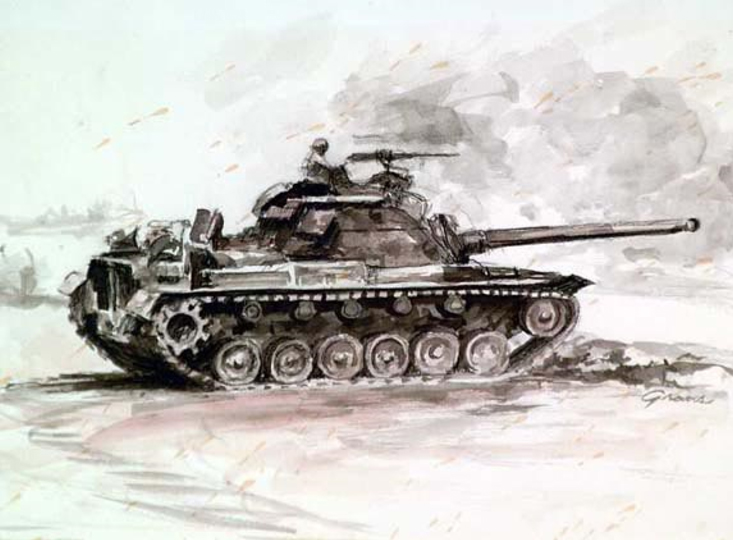
M-48 TANK by David E. Graves, CAT IX, 1969–70

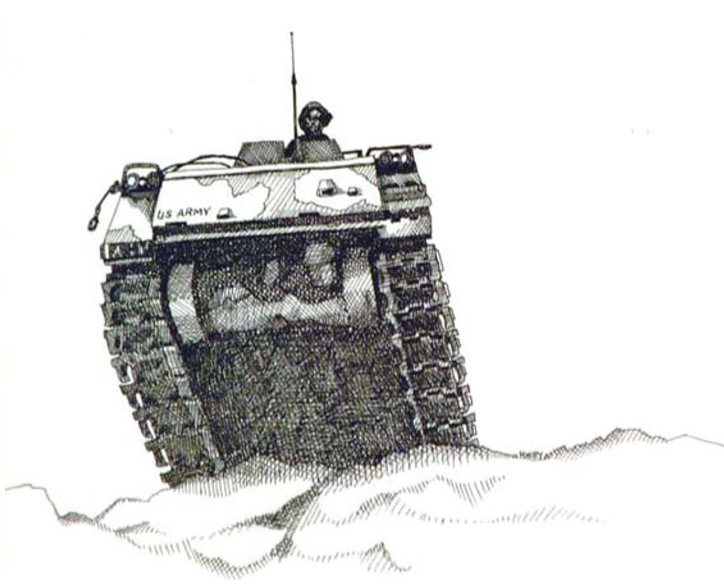
TANK by Bruce N. Rigby, CAT IX, 1969–70
