= American official war artists =

U.S. military creative arts program

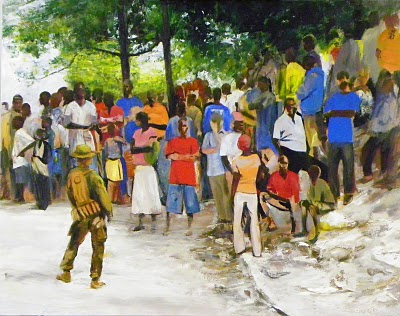
Rice distribution at Carrefour in Haiti after the earthquake in 2010. Oil sketch by Sgt. Kristopher Battles, USMC

American official war artists have been part of the American military since 1917. Artists are unlike the objective camera lens which records only a single instant and no more. The war artist captures instantaneous action and conflates earlier moments of the same scene within one compelling image.

"We're not here to do poster art or recruiting posters... What we are sent to do is to go to the experience, see what is really there and document it—as artists."

— Sgt. Kristopher Battles, USMC.

== History ==
In World War I, eight artists commissioned as captains in the U.S. Corps of Engineers. These men were sent to Europe to record the activities of the American Expeditionary Forces.

In 1941, the Navy Combat Art Program was founded in order to ensure that competent artists would be present at the scene of history-making events. Eight active duty artists developed a record of all phases of World War II; and all major naval operations have been depicted by Navy artists. During the Korean War, the program was revived with two military artists in combat contexts. Since then, artists have been sent to other combat zones, including the Persian Gulf.

The U.S. Army War Art Unit was established in late 1942; and by the spring of 1943, 42 artists were selected. In May 1943, Congress withdrew funding the unit was inactivated.

The Army's Vietnam Combat Art Program was started in 1966. Teams of soldier-artists created pictorial accounts and interpretations for the annals of army military history. These teams of five soldier-artists typically spent 60 days of temporary duty (TDY) in Vietnam embedded with various units. The U. S. Army Center of Military History (CMH) currently includes an Army Art Collection with about 40 representative war artists.

In 1992, the Army Staff Artist Program was attached to the United States Army Center of Military History. Army artists are a permanent part of the Museum Division's Collections Branch.

There are significant differences in the artwork created by the branches of the U.S. military:

When you go over to the Air Force, the art is all airplanes. In the Navy, it's all ships. Army art tends to be more about the battle, and the Army loves trucks. They're fixated on vehicles. But the Marine Corps is fixated on Marines.

— Anita Blair, chief strategist at the National Security Professional Development Integration Office

== Scope ==
Military art and the work of American military artists includes both peacetime and wartime. For example, USMC combat artist Kristopher Battles deployed with American forces in Haiti to provide humanitarian relief as part of Operation Unified Response after the disastrous earthquake in 2010.

== Select artists ==
=== World War I ===
- William James Aylward
- Walter Jack Duncan
- Harvey Thomas Dunn
- Kerr Eby Marines
- George Matthews Harding
- Wallace Morgan
- Ernest Clifford Peixotto
- J. Andre Smith.
- Don Troiani (born 1949)
- Harry Everett Townsend, Army.
- Claggett Wilson Army

=== World War II ===
- Paul Harding Myers, 1920–2007
- McClelland Barclay, 1891–1942
- George Biddle, 1885–1973
- Franklin Boggs, 1914-2009
- Aaron Bohrod, 1907–1992
- Howard Brodie, 1915–2010
- Manuel Bromberg, 1917–
- Jack Coggins, 1914–2006
- John Steuart Curry, 1897–1946, for information about his war art, see his artwork page
- Olin Dows, 1904–1981
- Edward Dugmore, 1915–1996
- William Franklin Draper, 1912–2003
- Nathan Glick, 1912–2002
- Albert A Gold, 1916-2006
- Mitchell Jamieson, 1915–1976
- Joe Jones, 1909–1963
- Yasuo Kuniyoshi, 1893–1953
- Warren Leopold, 1920–1998
- Roger Lewis, 1918-2000
- Henry Jay MacMillan (1908 1991) MacMiillan joined the U.S. Army in 1942 and soon became associated with the Army's art program at Fort Belvoir, Va. Attached to the 62nd Engineer Topographical Co. and later the headquarters of the Army's XIX Corps, he served as a combat artist in North Africa, Sicily, Normandy (where he executed a major study of German hedgerow defenses), Belgium, Holland and Germany. During the war, he executed a major body of watercolors and sketches documenting wartime destruction, battlefield landscapes and everyday military life. These were given major exhibitions in 1973 at the Wilmington-New Hanover County Museum and in 1994 (under the title "Behind the Lines") at the Cape Fear Museum.
- Ludwig Mactarian, 1908–1955
- John McDermott, 1919–1977
- Barse Miller, 1904-1973
- John Cullen Murphy, 1919–2004
- Albert K. Murray, 1906–1992
- Henry Varnum Poor, 1887–1970
- Dwight Shepler, 1905–1974
- Mitchell Siporin, 1910–1976
- Sidney Simon, 1917-1997 aka. Sid Simon,
- Standish Backus, 1910–1989
- Frede Vidar, 1911-1967
- Rudolph von Ripper, 1905-1960
- Taro Yashima, 1908–1994

=== Vietnam Era ===
==== Soldier Artist Participants in the U. S. Army Vietnam Combat Artists Program ====
- CAT I, 15 Aug - 15 Dec 1966, Roger A. Blum (Stillwell, KS), Robert C. Knight (Newark, NJ), Ronald E. Pepin (East Hartford, CT), Paul Rickert (Philadelphia, PA), Felix R. Sanchez (Fort Madison, IA), John O. Wehrle (Dallas, TX), and supervisor, Frank M. Sherman.
- CAT II, 15 Oct 1966 - 15 Feb 1967, Augustine G. Acuna (Monterey, CA), Alexander A. Bogdanovich (Chicago, IL), Theodore E. Drendel (Naperville, IL), David M. Lavender (Houston, TX), Gary W. Porter (El Cajon, CA), and supervisor, Carolyn M. O'Brien.
- CAT III, 16 Feb - 17 June 1967, Michael R. Crook (Sierra Madre, CA), Dennis O. McGee (Castro Valley, CA), Robert T. Myers (White Sands Missile Range, NM), Kenneth J. Scowcroft (Manassas, VA), Stephen H. Sheldon (Los Angeles, CA), and supervisor, C. Bruce Smyser.
- CAT IV, 15 Aug - 31 Dec 1967, Samuel E. Alexander (Philadelphia, MS), Daniel T. Lopez (Fresno, CA), Burdell Moody (Mesa, AZ), James R. Pollock (Pollock, SD), Ronald A. Wilson (Alhambra, CA), and technical supervisor, Frank M. Thomas.
- CAT V, 1 Nov 1967 - 15 March 1968, Warren W. Buchanan (Kansas City, MO), Philip V. Garner (Dearborn, MI), Phillip W. Jones (Greensboro, NC), Don R. Schol (Denton, TX), John R. Strong (Kanehoe, HI), and technical supervisor, Frank M. Thomas.
- CAT VI, 1 Feb - 15 June 1968, Robert T. Coleman (Grand Rapids, MI), David N. Fairrington (Oakland, CA), John D. Kurtz IV (Wilmington, DE), Kenneth T. McDaniel (Paris, TN), Michael P. Pala (Bridgeport, CT).
- CAT VII, 15 Aug - 31 Dec 1968, Brian H. Clark (Huntington, NY), William E. Flaherty Jr. (Louisville, KY), William C. Harrington (Terre Haute, IN), Barry W. Johnston (Huntsville, AL), Stephen H. Randall (Des Moines, IA), and supervisor, Fitzallen N. Yow.
- CAT VIII, 1 Feb - 15 June 1969, Edward J. Bowen (Carona Del Mar, CA), James R. Drake (Colorado Springs, CO), Roman Rakowsky (Cleveland, OH), Victory V. Reynolds (Idaho Falls, ID), Thomas B. Schubert (Chicago, IL), and supervisor, Fred B. Engel.
- CAT IX, 1 Sept 1969 - 14 Jan 1970, David E. Graves (Lawrence, KS), James S. Hardy (Coronado, CA), William R. Hoettels (San Antonio, TX), Bruce N. Rigby (Dekalb, IL), Craig L. Stewart (Laurel, MD), and supervisor, Edward C. Williams.

=== Recent conflicts ===
- Kristopher Battles
- Henry Casselli
- Michael D. Fay

== See also ==
- United States Army Art Program
- Vietnam Combat Artists Program
- United States Air Force Art Program
- War artists
- Military art
- War photography
