= Warren Leopold =

American architect

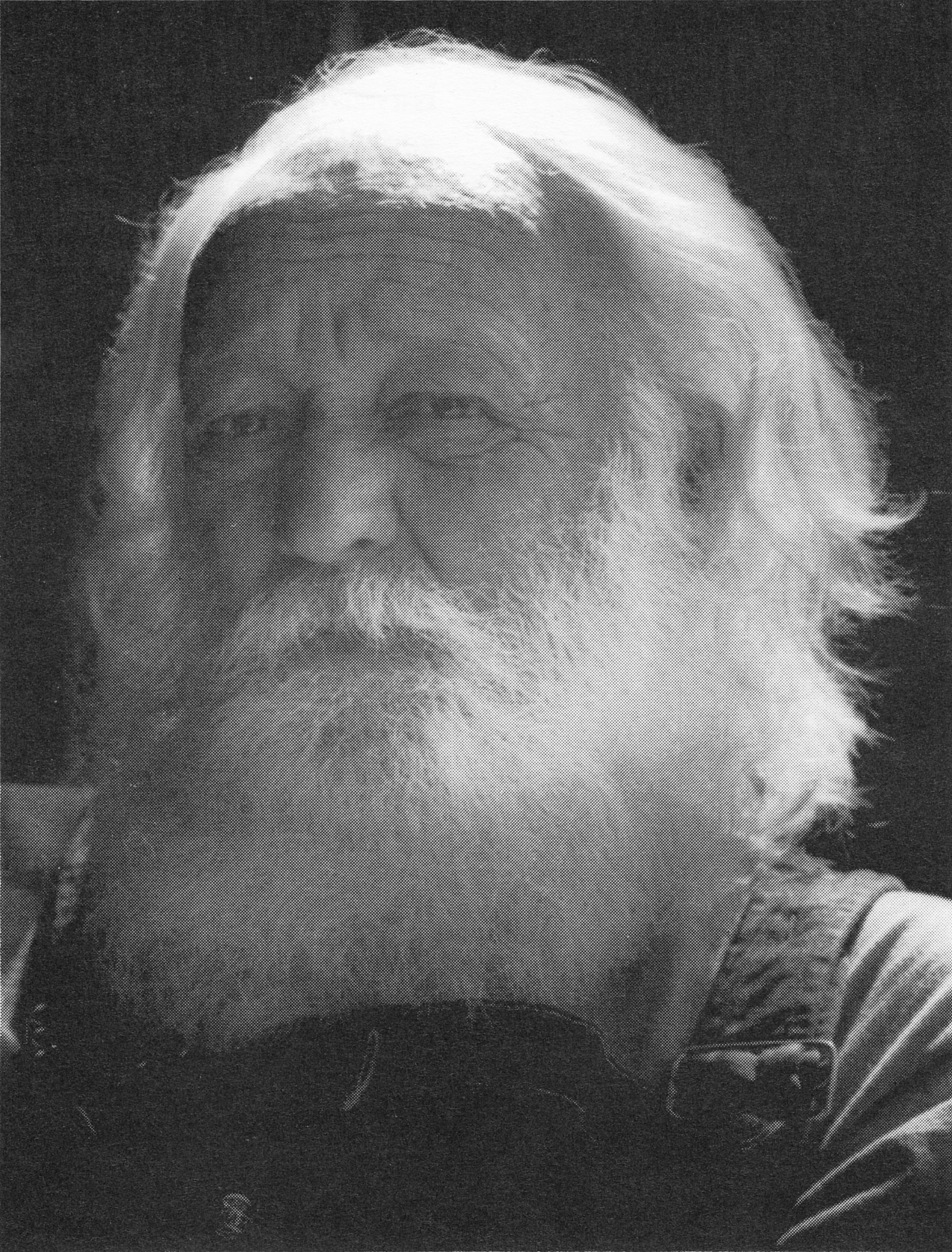
- Born: February 15, 1920
- Died: May 19, 1998 (aged 78)
- Education: California College of Arts and Crafts
- Occupation: Architect
- Spouse: Helen Leopold
- Buildings: Crazy House

Signature
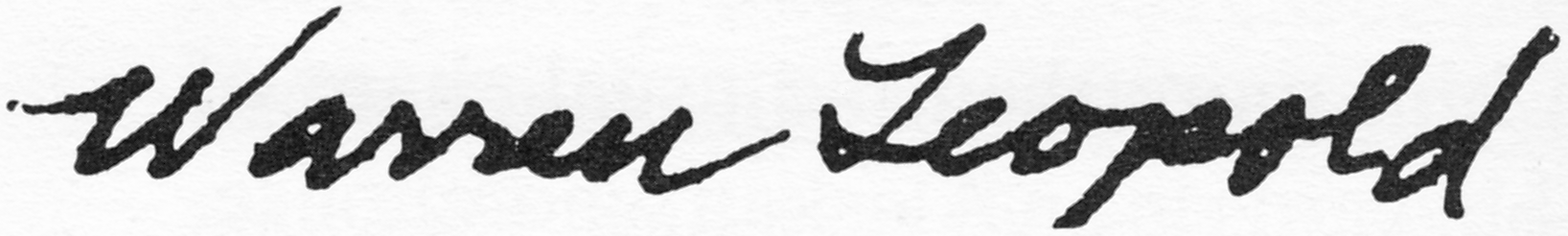

Warren Leopold (February 15, 1920 – May 19, 1998) was an American architect, painter and craftsman who designed and built coastal homes in Cambria, California and throughout San Luis Obispo County, California and whose work is part of the organic school.

== Personal life ==
In 1939, Leopold met his future wife, Helen, at a big-band dance at UC Berkeley where Helen was enrolled. He enlisted in the US Army in September 1940 while residing in Berkeley, California. Later that year Leopold and Helen married and moved to Carmel. They had four children: Mark, Laurel, Eric (d 1963) and David.

Following the attack on Pearl Harbor his regiment transferred to Alaska. Following the war, the family relocated to Big Sur and again to Cambria. In the late 1960s as Leopold's attentions turned toward his increasing project workload, he suffered, according to his daughter Laurel, a mid-life crisis which lead to his marriage to Helen ending in divorce.

Leopold stood trial in Washington for keeping his children out of public school. Albert Einstein submitted a letter in his defense.

Leopold was reputed to have lived on 21 dollars a day, receiving financial assistance from friends including Henry Miller. During his final decade, he could be found holding court on a bench near the Cambria post office.

== Work ==
=== Early career ===
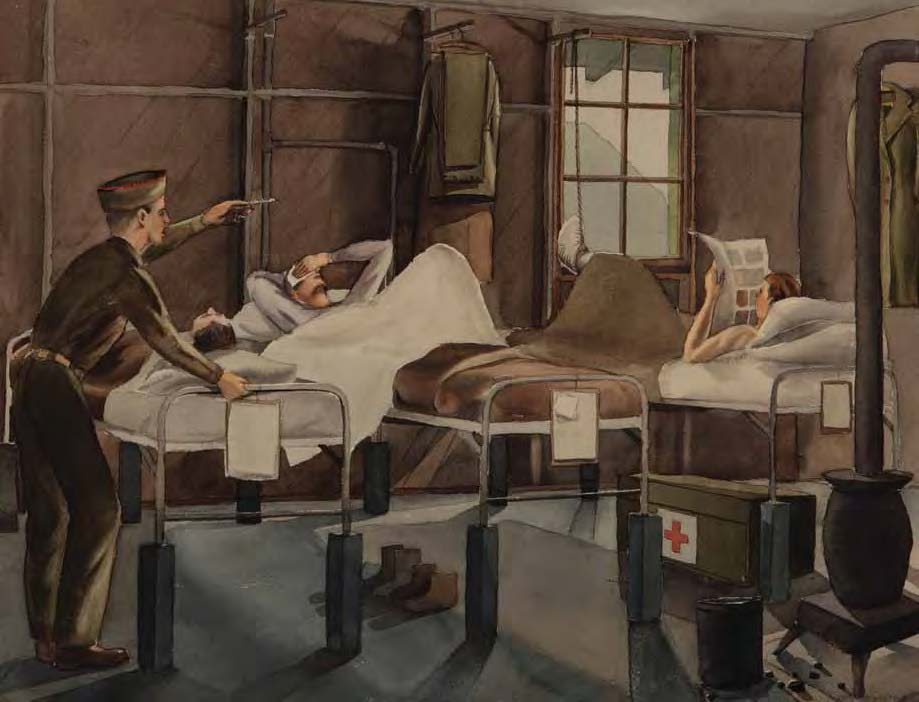
Taking Temperatures, 1943, painted during Leopold's service in the WWII War Art Unit

Leopold studied with Maurice Logan at California College of Arts and Crafts. After enlisting in September 1940 for service in the US Army during World War II, he became the first officially designated US Army Combat artist, holding this role from 1940 to 1943. He also painted portraits of WWII combat generals.

During WWII, while stationed by the US Army in Alaska to head the North War Art Unit, he met writer Dashiell Hammett and together financed a whorehouse there. Their friendship influenced Leopold's artistic philosophy, leading to a greater interest in the natural world and to a greater desire to lead a simplified life. He retired from the Army in 1948 and subsequently moved to Big Sur in the hope of meeting Henry Miller, whose books he had read while stationed in Alaska. Miller, after meeting Leopold, commissioned him along with sculptor Gordon Newell to build a studio addition to his home—work that was interspersed with "erudite Miller monologues, so we were educated while we worked." Following completion, Leopold occupied the studio for a year in exchange for performing domestic duties for the Miller household.

=== Architectural career ===
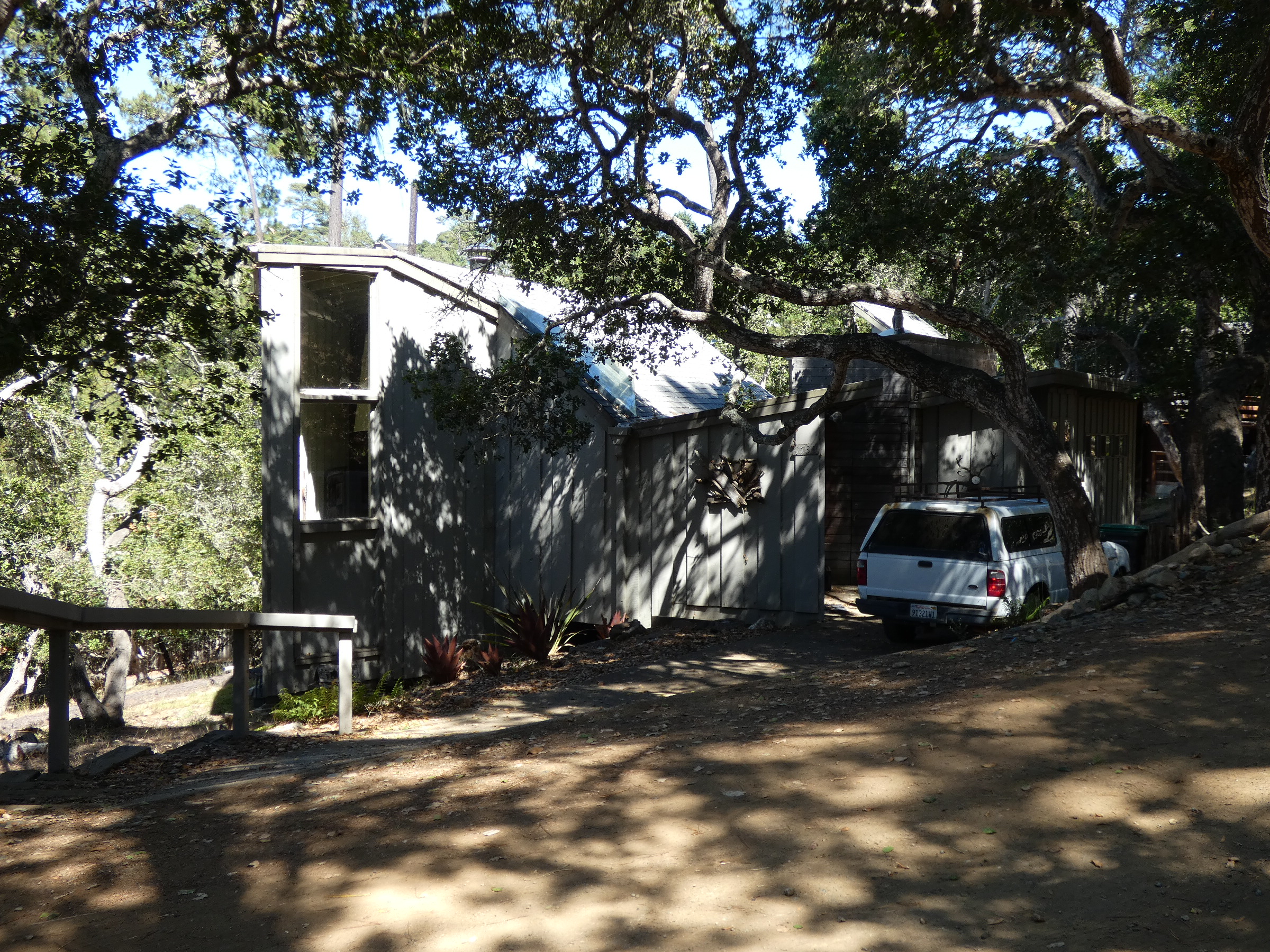
Front facade of Warren Leopold's 'Crazy House' in Cambria

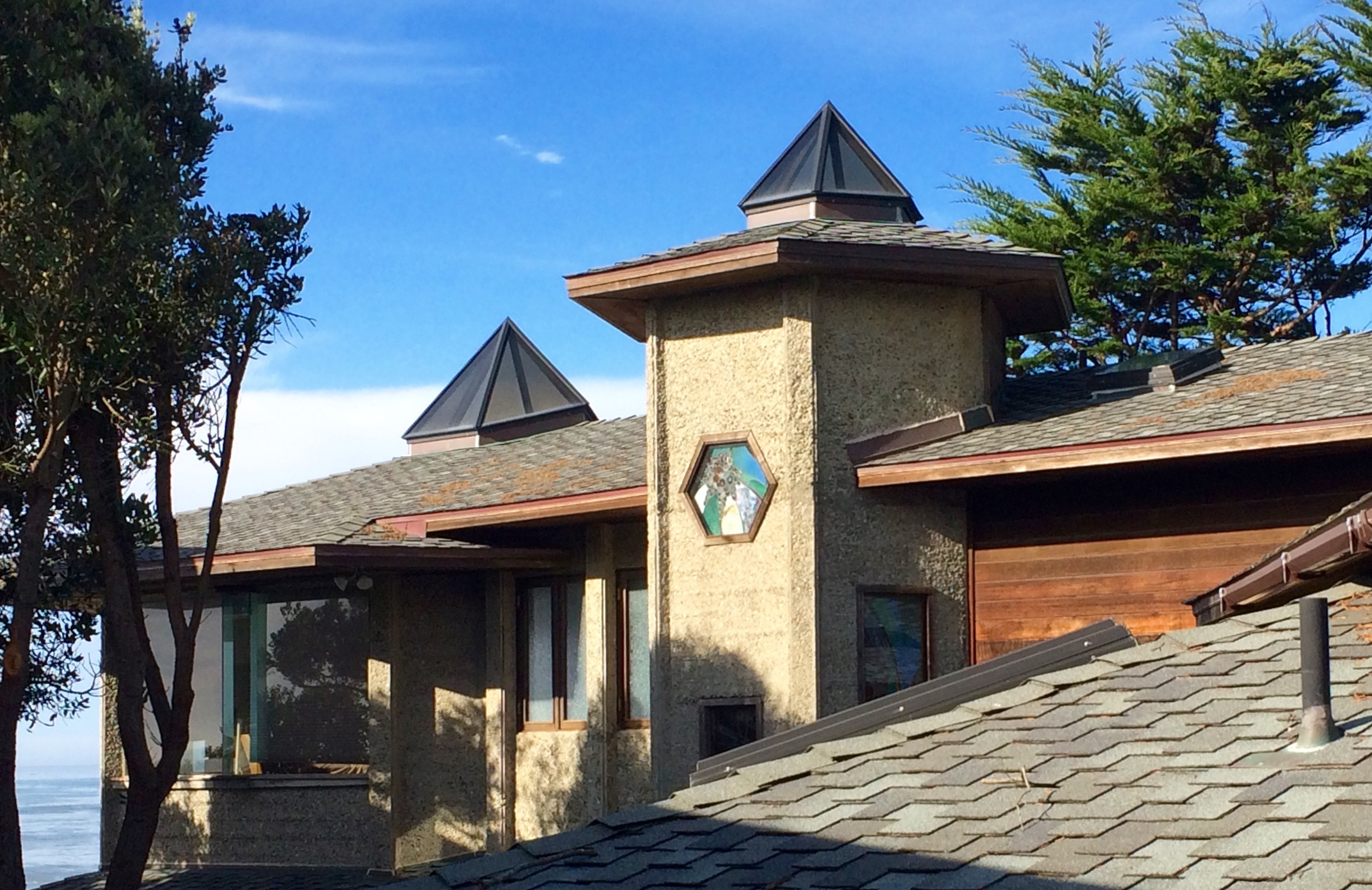
Warren Leopold-designed house (1968), 2431 Sherwood Dr, Cambria

Leopold designed his first residential structure in the late 1940s, building it on the Garcia River. While living in Big Sur, Leopold befriended modernist architect Rowan Maiden (1913–1957), who from 1939 to 1941 studied at Taliesin West under Frank Lloyd Wright, and who went on to design the landmark Nepenthe restaurant in the Organic tradition. His progressive philosophy influenced Leopold's burgeoning architectural vision.

During 1947–1948, Leopold built his most notable structure, known as 'Crazy House', an artist's retreat located in Cambria that was conceived without right angles in its design. In the early 1960s, he left Big Sur to relocate to Cambria where he created designs for over 100 clients in Cambria, and Carmel, and Big Sur.

From the late 1960s through the 1970s, his work enjoyed a devoted following among California Polytechnic State University architecture students. He discontinued his work as an architect during the final 15 years of his life due to his dissatisfaction with the increasing complexity of local building regulations. Leopold lamented, "Bureaucracy is killing the creativity in this country. All the forms you have to fill out now don't leave any room for imagination."

Leopold notably never obtained an architect's license, signing his drawings "Warren Leopold N.A.L.A.", the initials standing for "Not a Licensed Architect". The signature stood not only as a disclosure but an indication of his outsider philosophical posture.
