= Sidney Simon =

American painter

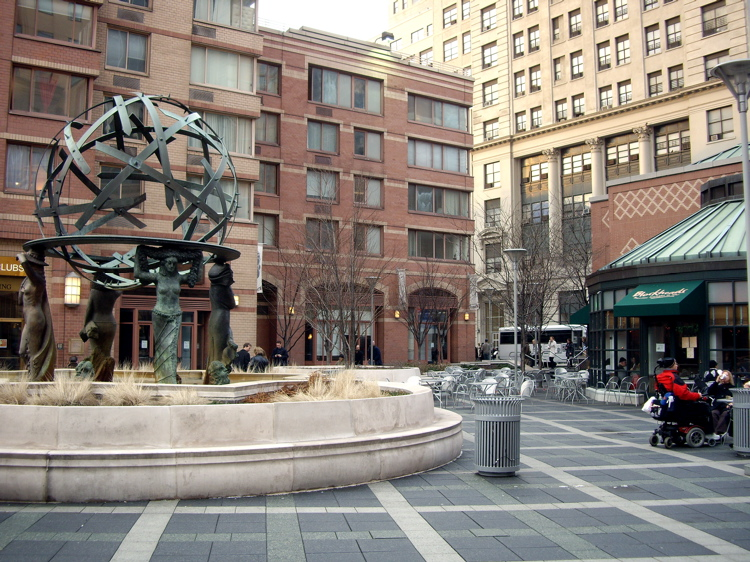
- The Four Seasons Fountain Sculpture located at One Worldwide Plaza, New York, New York
- Born: May 21, 1917; Pittsburgh, Pennsylvania
- Died: August 4, 1997 (aged 80); Truro, Massachusetts
- Other name: Sid Simon
- Education: Bachelor of fine Arts
- Alma mater: University of Pennsylvania
- Occupation: Artist
- Years active: 1938–1997
- Era: New York School (art)
- Known for: American official war artist
- Notable work: U.S. and Japan WWII peace treaty signing aboard the U.S.S. Missouri; The Four Seasons Fountain Sculpture
- Style: Painting, Sculpture
- Military career
- Allegiance: United States of America
- Branch: United States Army
- Service years: 1942–1946
- Rank: Captain
- Conflicts: South West Pacific Theatre of World War II
- Awards: Bronze Star

Sidney A. Simon (May 21, 1917 – August 4, 1997) was an American painter, sculptor, muralist, art school co-founder, and American official war artist.

== Early life ==
Sidney Simon was born May 21, 1917, in Pittsburgh, Pennsylvania. His father was James Simon, a shoe store merchant. In 1912, Simon's father emigrated from an area between Siedlce and Sokołów Podlaski in Poland, then under Russian rule. His mother was Minnie Lipman, who emigrated in 1913 with her family from Kalvarija, Lithuania, then under Russian rule. James and Minnie Simon's marriage produced four children: Sidney A., Helen Judith, Leon Jacob, and David Irving. Minnie Lipman's father's Americanized name was "Max Lipman," shortened from his European name which was Avram Michael Lipmanovich. The 1930 U.S. Census states Simon's family to have resided at 2766 Beechwood Boulevard, in Squirrel Hill, an east-end Pittsburgh neighborhood. His interest in art began at an early age.

== Education ==
Simon attended Taylor Allderdice High School in Pittsburgh, Pennsylvania. At an early age, his potential as an artist was already recognized by his teachers when several of his works toured with the National Scholastic Art Exhibit. One of Simon's sculptures, titled Mother Earth gained special recognition, earning Simon a one-year scholarship to the Dayton Art Institute and a John L. Porter Scholarship which afforded Simon two months of study at Carnegie Institute of Technology (now Carnegie Mellon University). In 1936, Taylor Allderdice High School honored Simon with a one-man show when they lined their halls with his works in the only one man show given to one student up until that time. After completing his secondary education, Simon attended the University of Pennsylvania from 1931 to 1936, where he earned a bachelor in fine arts. During this period, Simon also studied at the Pennsylvania Academy of the Fine Arts, in addition to two years at The Barnes Foundation of Merion, Pennsylvania. After World War II, Simon studied and attended classes at the Académie de la Grande Chaumière, in Paris, France.

== Military service ==
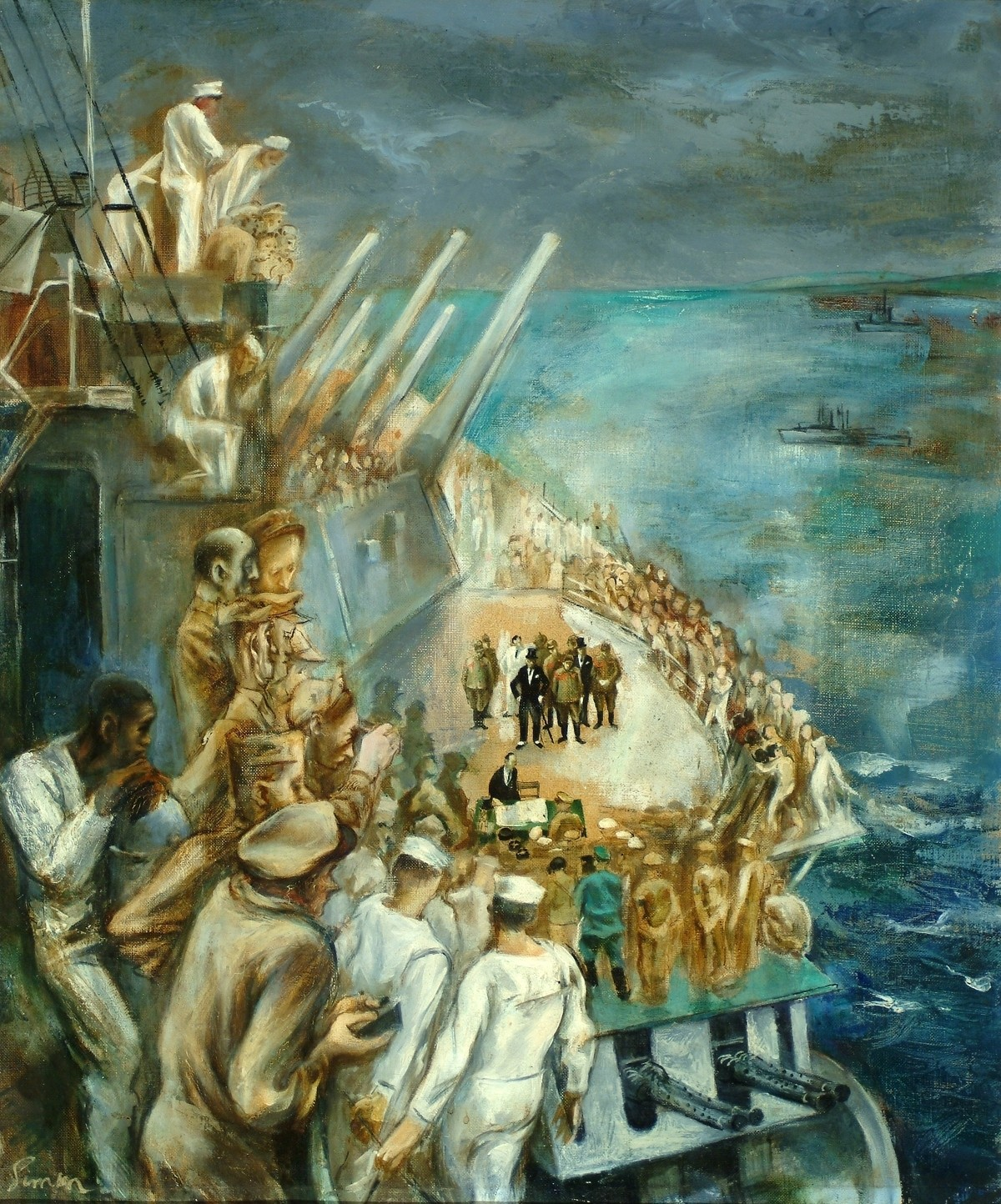
Watercolor painting by Sidney Simon of the formal Japanese Surrender as witnessed aboard the U.S.S. Missouri February 11, 1945 – in Tokyo Bay.

Simon enlisted in the U.S. Army on November 11, 1942, eventually reaching the rank of captain. At age 25, then stationed at Fort Belvoir, Virginia, Simon's art talent was recognized and he was tasked with heading and developing a special service branch referred to as [the] Morale Division. This experimental art and design test pilot project led the way for other, similar morale projects throughout the military. Simon's Morale Division was tasked with improving the appeal of the recreation center with murals and other appointments. It was while Simon was stationed at Fort Belvoir that he met and worked with fellow soldier Willard W.Cummings, who was also part of this Morale Division art detail. Simon and Cummings would later co-found The Skowhegan School of Painting and Sculpture along with two other artists,. From March 1943 – October 1945, Captain Simon served as an American official war artist and was assigned to General Douglas MacArthur's headquarters. Simon, along with three other artists of his art unit, covered major operations in New Guinea and the Philippines during the South West Pacific Theater of World War II operations. His duties included painting, drawing, and field reconnaissance intelligence. Simon was chosen to paint the formal surrender ceremony as witnessed September 2, 1945, in Tokyo Bay aboard battleship USS Missouri. referred to as V-J Day, ending WWII. This historical painting is reported to have hung in the White House. Simon was discharged and released on April 19, 1946.

== Post-military career ==
In 1946, Simon, along with artists Willard W. Cummings (1915–1975), Henry Varnum Poor (1888–1971), and Charles Cutler (1914–1970), developed and founded The Skowhegan School of Painting and Sculpture located in Madison, Maine. In addition to the Skowhegan School, Simon also served on the faculties of the Parsons School of Design, the Art Students League, the Brooklyn Museum Art School, Columbia University, Cooper Union, the New York Studio School, Sarah Lawrence College and the Castle Truro Center for the Arts. One of his most noted public commissions is a fountain consisting of four females holding up a stylized globe of the earth, titled The Four Seasons and located central to a public plaza at One Worldwide Plaza in New York City.

== Personal life ==
Simon's first marriage, to Joan E. Lewisohn, produced five children: Mark Simon, Teru Simon, Rachel Simon, Nora Simon and Juno Simon Duenas. Lewisohn and Simon divorced in 1961. In 1968, Simon married Renee Adriance, in Manhattan, New York City; they had two children, Nick Simon and Tony Simon. Tony Simon performs as Blockhead.

== Death ==
Sidney Simon died on August 4, 1997, at the age of 80 in Truro, Massachusetts, of congestive heart failure.

== Notable works ==
- Formal Surrender of Imperial Japan aboard the USS Missouri. Painting.
- The Four Seasons Fountain, on the public plaza located at One Worldwide Plaza, New York, New York. – Sculpture.
- South Solon Meetinghouse South Solon, Maine. – Mural Painting.
- The Family of Man Medallion. Designer.

== Professional associations ==
- Listed in Who's Who in American Art since 1950.
