= William Franklin Draper (artist) =

American artist (1912–2003)

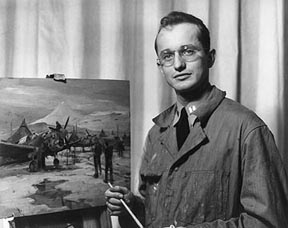
- William Franklin Draper
- Born: William Franklin Draper; December 24, 1912; Hopedale, MA
- Died: October 26, 2003 (aged 90)
- Known for: Painting
- Notable work: Portrait of John F. Kennedy
- Awards: Bronze Star; Lifetime Achievement award: Portrait Society of America.

William Franklin Draper (December 24, 1912 – October 26, 2003) was an American painter and a lieutenant commander in the United States Navy.

== Early life ==
Draper was born in Hopedale, Massachusetts, on December 24, 1912. His father was Clare H. Draper, son of General William Franklin Draper, who served in the Civil War and later as Ambassador to Italy. Draper's mother was Mathilda Engman Draper, who was from Kentucky. The family owned the Draper Corporation once among the nation's largest manufacturer of textile looms and related machines. Draper's father was on a fishing trip in Nova Scotia when the Wall Street crash of 1929 hit, and was unable to sell stock in the company causing a significant financial loss during Draper's teenage years. As a child, Draper's was a child prodigy on the piano. He attended the Pomfret School in Connecticut and then Harvard University in 1930 to study concert piano. He subsequently changed his focus to painting and spent time in Provincetown, Massachusetts, studying with Charles Webster Hawthorne and Henry Hensche. Draper attended the National Academy of Design in New York, and the Cape Cod School of Art in Massachusetts. Following his education, he went to Spain to study briefly with Harry Zimmerman (protege of Paul Sacks), and then moved to France, where he attended the Académie de la Grande Chaumière. In 1937, he studied sculpture with George Demetrius, a Boston sculptor, and Jon Corbino in Rockport.

== Career as a combat artist in World War II ==
In 1942, Draper entered the Naval Reserves as a lieutenant (junior grade). After his initial training, Draper was assigned to the Anti-submarine warfare Unit in Boston. Following his service in Boston, he transferred into the Naval Art Section, to be an American official war artists, and was dispatched to Alaska, where he spent nearly half a year painting in the Aleutian Islands. He spent time on Amchitka and several of his paintings depict the attacks by the Japanese, as seen from his close-range foxhole. Draper painted while dealing with the wind and Arctic weather, which made painting difficult, as he had to wear gloves to keep from getting frostbite.

After Draper returned from Alaska, he was requested as the artist for the portrait of Rear Admiral J.R. Beardall, then Superintendent of the United States Naval Academy. Following the completion of the portrait, he was specifically ordered to paint Admiral Nimitz in Pearl Harbor and Admiral Halsey in Newmire, among others.

After the Bougainville Campaign, Draper was assigned to the USS Yorktown (CV-10), and while on duty, painted the series of air attacks on Palau, the landings at Hollandia, and the airstrikes on Truk island. Draper also covered invasions of Saipan and Guam aboard the USS Tennessee (BB-43). During his tour on the Tennessee, the ship was hit three times by enemy fire, and they were forced to land at Guam.

On returning to the U.S. after the war, Draper married Barbara Natalia Cagiati in Washington, D.C., where he completed three murals commissioned for the Naval Academy in Bancroft Hall. Draper was awarded the Bronze Star for his Naval services, and left the Navy in 1945 as a Lieutenant Commander.

== Professional career as an artist ==
After his military service, Draper started a family and moved from Washington to New York City, in a house that belonged to sculptor Daniel Chester French. The Metropolitan Museum of Art had a combat artists show, and there was one titled, "Men at War," in Washington, both of which helped Draper's work to become known. Then in 1949, he obtained his Park Avenue studio in NYC, and began his portraiture career in earnest. For approximately fifty years, captains of industry, university deans, heads of state, luminaries and historical figures from many walks of life had their portraits painted in Draper's Park Avenue studio – often completed in five days, 2 sittings a day. His commissioned works ranged from Richard M. Nixon, (1981), John Foster Dulles, the Shah of Iran (painted in 1967), James Michener (1979), Dr. Charles Mayo for the Mayo Clinic, Walter H. Annenberg, Mrs. Dorothy Chandler, Terence Cardinal Cooke, Henry Kaiser, and Dr. Richard E. Winter (1992).

Draper was the only artist to paint John F. Kennedy from life. In 1962, Draper flew to Palm Beach, FL, where Kennedy sat for a sketch, which Draper used as a reference for several other commissioned portraits of Kennedy, among them the Harvard University and the National Portrait Gallery at the Smithsonian Institution.

Throughout his career, Draper always painted landscapes due to his great interest in nature. He showed at Knoedler, the Graham Gallery, Portraits, Inc., the Far Gallery, The Findlay Galleries (New York, NY) and the Robert C. Vose Galleries (Boston, MA). His work has been included in shows at the National Portrait Gallery and the Corcoran Gallery of Art (Washington, D.C.), The National Academy of Design (New York, NY), The Boston Museum of Fine Arts, (Boston, MA) the Fogg Art Museum, (one of the Harvard Art Museums, Cambridge, MA), the National Gallery, (London), Salon de la Marine (Paris) and in museums in Australia.

For many years, he enjoyed teaching at the Art Students League of New York. In 1999, Draper received a lifetime achievement award from the Portrait Society of America.

Draper died on October 26, 2003, at the age of 90.
