= Kristopher Battles =

American combat artist

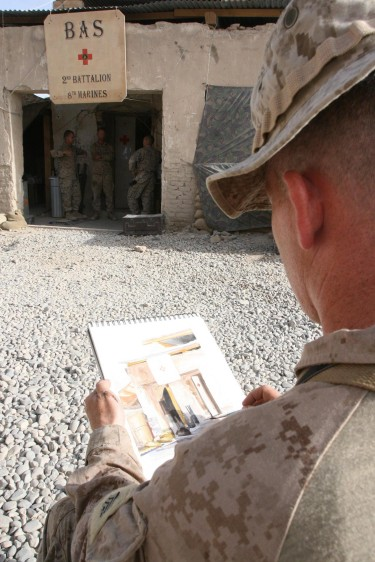
Sgt. Kristopher J. Battles, sketching while on active duty in Iraq.

Kristopher J. Battles is an American artist, known as one of a few remaining USMC combat artist in 2010.

== Military career ==
Battles joined the Corps in 1986. He served as a computer operator, combat correspondent and chaplain's assistant. He had to reenlist for active duty as a combat artist.

... the Marine Corps' philosophy, and I think all good art, is that if you go and you see and you paint what you feel and you have seen and experienced, it's much more authentic. And the philosophy of the Marine Corps and the combat art program is that it's much stronger expression if you go to a situation and you see it and you experience it. — Sgt. Kristopher Battles

=== War artist ===
The United States Marine Corps supported more than 70 war artists in World War II; and the number of combat artists has declined since the end of the Vietnam War. In July 2010, the Corps supported only one combat artist. Today the program has grown, with other military and civilian war artists serving under Battles' leadership and experience.

Artists like SSgt Elize Mckelvey, Captain Charles J. Baumann III and Captain Michael L. Reynolds are under the charge of Battles where they document Marine Corps operations via illustration for historical documentation Combat Artists Illustrate Marine Raiders

Since World War I, a long line of American servicemen-artists have produced artwork based on their experiences in combat. The USMC artists have documented the life of Marines in the field. Like his predecessors, Sgt. Battles' artwork develops during a process of "balancing a tactical eye as a Marine" with the "artist's visual eye" and also noticing the way the light is bouncing off the body armor. Battles' deployment to Iraq gave him a sharper eye for what can be portrayed in a combat zone.

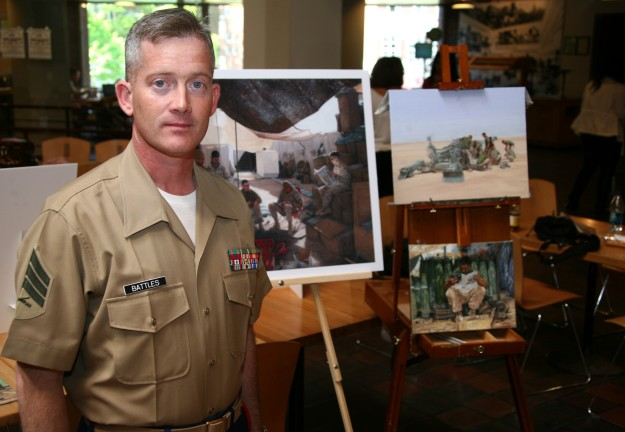
Sgt. Battles stands in front of some of his paintings.

"Go to war, do art" is the motto of a Marine combat artist. The mission is to capture images of war on canvases and sketchpads.

== Honors ==
- 2008: The Colonel John W. Thomason, Jr Award presented by the Marine Corps Heritage Foundation
- 2010: United States Marine Corps Combat Correspondents Association, Merit Award, First Place Combat Art.

== See also ==
- War artist
- American official war artists
- Michael D. Fay
