= Michael D. Fay =

United States Marine

Michael Fay
- Born: Allentown, Pennsylvania
- Military career
- Allegiance: United States
- Branch: United States Marine Corps
- Service years: 1975-1978; 1983-1993
- Rank: Chief Warrant Officer-2
- Conflicts: Operation Desert Shield; Operation Desert Storm; Operation Eastern Exit; Operation Provide Promise; Operation Enduring Freedom (twice); Operation Anaconda; Operation Mavericks; Operation Iraqi Freedom (twice); Operation River Gate; Operation Steel Curtain; Operation Iron Hammer
- Awards: Navy Commendation Medal; Navy Achievement Medal x2; Combat Action Ribbon

Michael D. Fay is a former United States Marine Corps combat artist. Before his retirement from the Corps, he was a war artist serving in Iraq. He was deployed as an artist-correspondent embedded with US troops in Afghanistan. He resides in Fredericksburg, Virginia.

== Military career ==
Fay enlisted in the United States Marine Corps in 1975 and was discharged in 1978 as an 81 mm mortarman (MOS 0341). In 1978, he returned to Pennsylvania State University and graduated in 1982 with a Bachelor of Science in Art Education. In 1983, re-enlisted into the Marines and served as an avionics technician (MOS 6322) working on CH-46s, VH-3Ds, CH-53Es and UH/AH-1s in the Presidential Helicopter Squadron (HMX-1) and Marine Medium Helicopter Squadron 365 (HMM-365) until 1993. Fay served a tour on recruiting duty (MOS 8411) at Recruiting Station Baltimore as a recruiter of the year for 1989 and 1990. He left active duty at the end of September 1993.

Fay returned to service in the Marine Corps Reserve in January 2000. He was assigned as an official combat artist with the National Museum of the Marine Corps Combat Art Collection. He is now retired from the Marine Corps.

=== War artist ===
The United States Marine Corps supports three combat artists (Note: Sources differ on the numbers. in recent years (2013) the number of combat artists has dwindled to one. This figure is for the USMC. Other fighting units deploy their own artists) to produce fine art based on their experiences of combat and the life of Marines on the battlefield. The orders are "Go to war. Do art." The artists are unfettered in their choice of subject. Fay's artwork is in the Marine Corps Combat Art collection, the National Museum of the Marine Corps and the collection of the James A. Michener Art Museum in Doylestown, Pennsylvania.

Fay has also had solo exhibitions at the Farnsworth Museum, where he was the target of a protest group. His artwork has been published in Leatherneck Magazine—the official magazine of the Marine Corps Association—and the New York Times. The Guardian called his work "exceptionally moving and thought-provoking", and said, "Over the past decade, Fay has seen action as a war artist with US troops in both Iraq and Afghanistan, but his latest journey was to a military veterans' hospital in Richmond, Virginia. In the resulting New York Times blogs, he relays his meetings with three young men severely wounded in Afghanistan. His account of their injuries and rehabilitation is gripping, but what really deepens the reporting are his drawings, reproduced alongside the articles."

Fay has also recorded wounded veterans recovering from their injuries. As part of this work he founded the Joe Bonham Project to document the experiences of the wounded. After retirement, Fay campaigned for enhanced recognition and improved working opportunities for war artists. Fay also uses sculpture. He holds a Master of Fine Arts in Illustration; his thesis was called The Boy Who Drew Soldiers.

== See also ==
- War artist
- American official war artists
- Kristopher Battles
