= Joe Bonham Project =

The Joe Bonham Project is named after the fictional protagonist of Dalton Trumbo's 1939 anti-war novel Johnny Got His Gun. Its purpose is to portray the reality of war to the public with art that portrays the human consequences of combat. Founded by war artist Michael D. Fay, the organisation holds exhibitions to introduce the public to artistic representations of war and the aftermath of war.

The project distances itself from politics, preferring instead to be seen as apolitical "Witness Art".
