= Harry Everett Townsend =

American painter

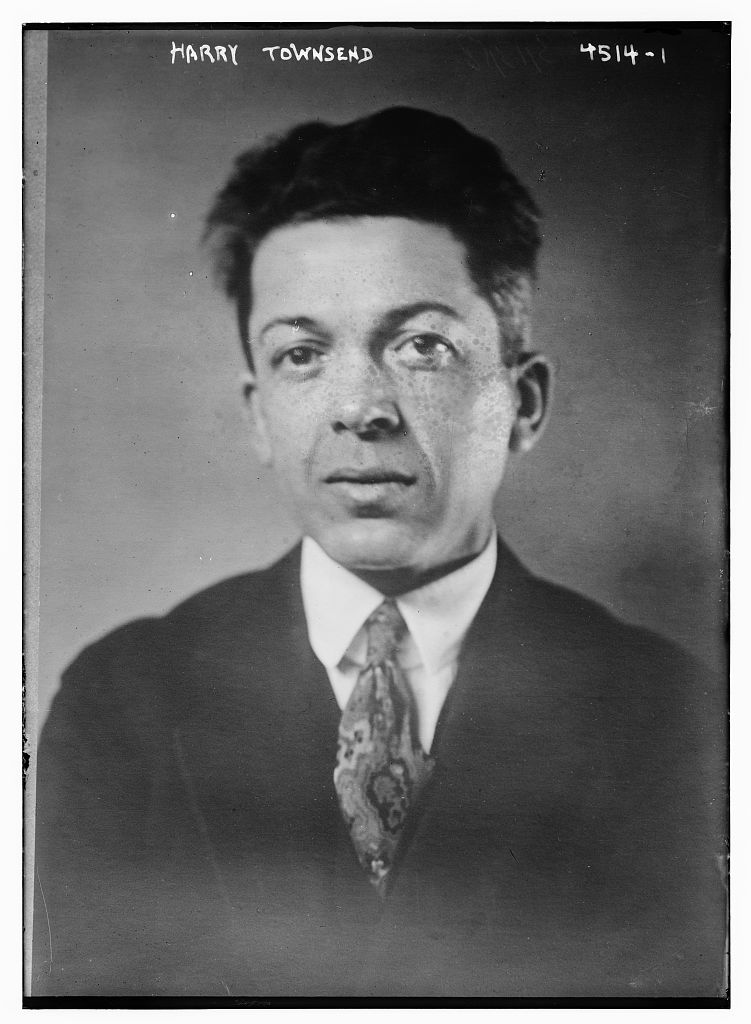
Townsend in 1918

Harry Everett Townsend (1879–1941) was a war artist for the United States Army during World War I.

== Biography ==
Harry Everett Townsend was born in Wyoming, Illinois into a family of prosperous farmers and merchants. Early in life he displayed his talent for art by earning money as a sign painter for local businessmen. After graduation from high school he went to Chicago to study at the Art Institute. During the summers he serviced farm equipment for the McCormick Harvesting Machine Company and traveled to the American Southwest. Both the Rock Island and Santa Fe Railroads used his scenic paintings for advertising.

In 1900 Townsend began to work with Howard Pyle, after which he studied briefly in Paris and in London. He returned to Chicago in 1904 to teach for a short time at the Academy of Fine Arts, after which he moved to Leonia, New Jersey, to begin a successful career illustrating magazines such as Harper's, The Century Magazine, Everybody's, and McClure's as well as a number of books. In 1912 he established a studio in northern France so that he could be close to both Paris and London. The onset of war forced Townsend to return to the United States, where he resumed his work as an illustrator.

He began his war service drawing posters before receiving his captain's commission in 1918. Much of Townsend's work during the war focuses on the human element. He produced a number of images showing how the rigors of combat eventually leave little to distinguish between winners and losers in war. After the war Townsend returned to illustrating. His experiences with the AEF, War Diary of a Combat Artist, were published in 1991.

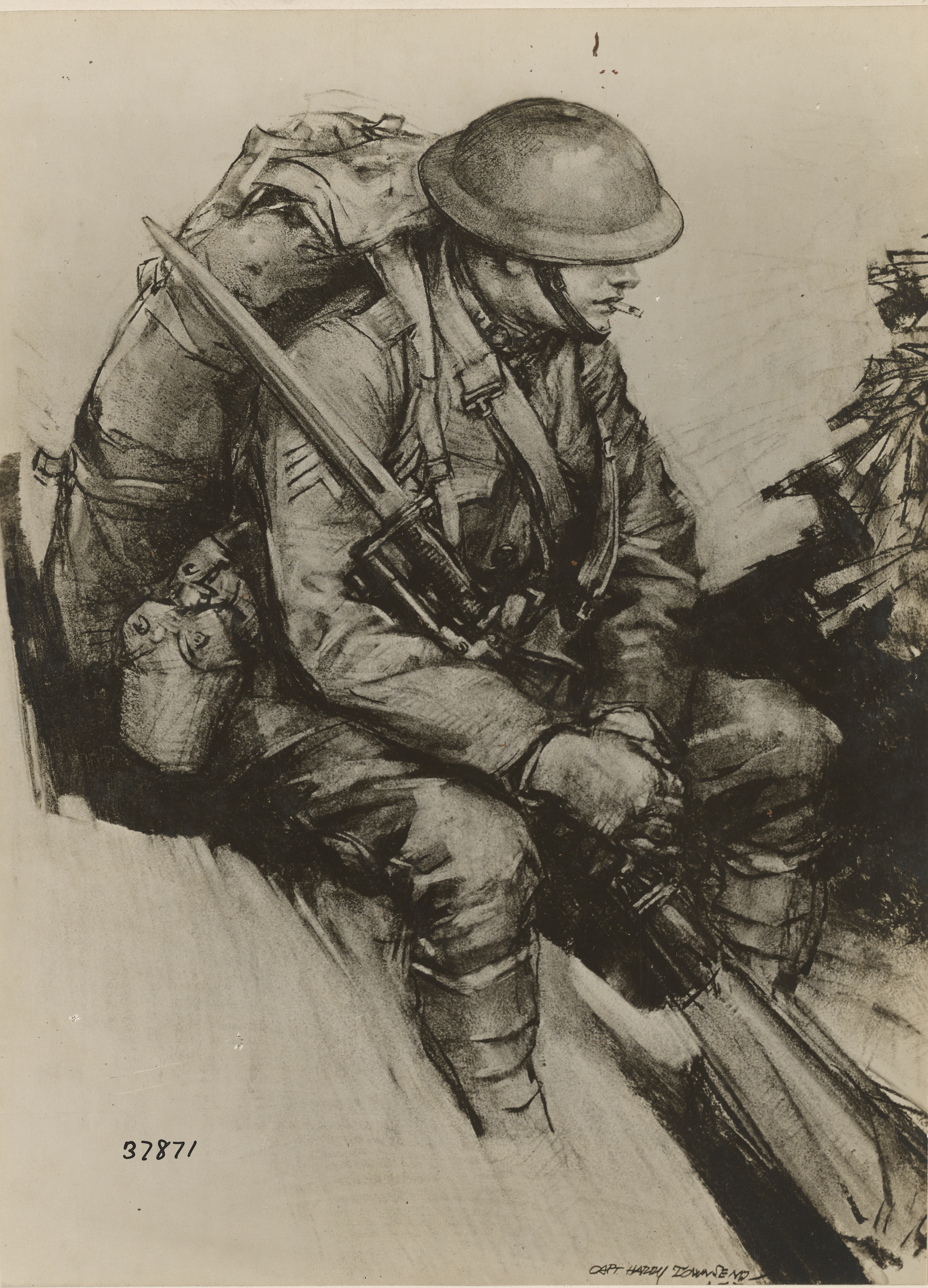
Drawing of Pvt Berhens S.C.
