= United States Air Force Art Program =

Program of the United States Air Force

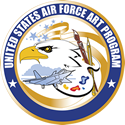
Air Force Art Program Logo

The USAF Art Program of the United States Air Force was begun in 1950, with the transfer of ~800 works of art from the United States Army. Today the program maintains its headquarters and museum in the NCR.

== History ==
The USAF Art Program and the beginning of its extensive collection of aviation art began in 1950 with the transfer from the U.S. Army of some 800 works of art documenting the early days of the Army Air Corps. In addition, under General Curtis LeMay, a "portrait" program was initiated. These portraits of senior officers, along with the donated art from the Army Air Corps, the works of noted artists Henri Farre (a French air combat pilot-artist in World War I) and Frank E. Beresford (a British artist and war correspondent in World War II), and captured German art from the Second World War, constituted the nucleus of a collection that serves as a valuable historical record of military aviation through the first half of the twentieth century.

In 1951, the Air Force sponsored a tour of USAF installations for 30 cartoonists, and in 1952 the Air Force sponsored 30 artists from the Society of Illustrators (New York). The concept of an official program, designed to record the Air Force story through the medium of art was born. Responsibility for the growing collection of donated art that would document the history of military aviation and the U.S. Air Force was given to the Secretary of the Air Force, Office of Information Services. It was a natural home at the time because much of the combat art produced in World War I and World War II by the U.S. and allies was done in support of domestic and foreign propaganda and public information programs.

Historians belonged to the Information Services career field at that time as well. More importantly, the central purpose behind the program was to document the "Air Force story"--a job that belonged to Information Services. Telling the story through art--with sponsorship of artists trips to Air Force installations to cover activities and events--was a natural extension of the Air Force public relations program's effort to tell the young Service's story through news media representatives, books, magazines, special public exhibits, trips and briefings for important community/opinion leaders. The Art Program became a part of the Civil Liaison Division of the Office of information Services to document the Air Force History.

In a major milestone that was to shape the direction and content of the program for the next fifty years, the Air Force met with the prestigious Society of Illustrators of New York, inviting them formally to participate in the USAF Art Program. They enthusiastically accepted the Air Force's invitation, and the mechanism was established whereby civilian artists, members of the Society of Illustrators, were sent on officially sponsored trips to Air Force installations all over the world. Later, the Societies of Illustrators of Los Angeles, San Francisco, the Midwest Air Force Artists, the Southwest Society of Air Force Artists, and numerous independent artists joined the program.

Artworks produced from officially sponsored trips are "donated" to the U.S. Air Force--usually as outright "gifts to the Government"--accepted on behalf of a grateful nation and Air Force by the Secretary of the Air Force. Societies review works of their members before offering them as gifts. The "formal" presentation of artwork took on all the glamour of a New York society art show, as the Societies (then later the Air Force) hosted a formal "Art Presentation" every even year to unveil and exhibit their works to be donated to the service.

While there have been programmatic changes in the Air Force's Art Program, it has retained the essential characteristics it started with--art in support of Service public relations and Service support of the documentation of art.

== Headquarters ==
The Air Force Art Program has its headquarters located in the Pentagon. Today, there are nearly 9,000 works in the Air Force Art Program and the Society of Illustrators has been joined by other organizations and independent artists to continue documenting Air Force personnel, equipment, locations and activities. While they accord the artist all courtesies and privileges as an equivalent grade of GS15/rank or Colonel, the artist's income and opportunities are suspended during the assignment and creation of the work. Additionally, all work is donated to the Air Force without any permissible tax deductions.

Artists of the Air Force Art Program were actually caught in the fighting of Hue, Vietnam, during the Tet Offensive.

Every eighteen months, a tuxedo banquet was held in Washington DC, for the participating artists of that period. The event was hosted by the Secretary of the Air Force.

== See also ==
- United States Army Art Program
- American official war artists
