= Henry Casselli =

American painter

Henry Calvin Casselli Jr. (born October 25, 1946) is a contemporary American artist from New Orleans, Louisiana. He primarily paints watercolors of figures and settings from his native New Orleans.

== Life and career ==
Henry Casselli was born and raised in the ethnically diverse Ninth Ward of New Orleans, New Orleans, Louisiana.

Casselli received a scholarship to study at the McCrady School of Fine and Applied Arts in the French Quarter of New Orleans, where he enrolled in 1964 after graduating from high school. He was tutored by John McCrady, and joined the faculty as an assistant instructor during his second year at the school.

Young Men Growing Old, by Henry Casselli

In 1967, as the American involvement in the war in Vietnam escalated, Casselli voluntarily enlisted in the United States Marine Corps. He was assigned the position of combat artist, and upon his deployment found himself immersed in the Tet Offensive of 1968. As Casselli later recalled, "[W]ithin three days of my arrival, I was knee-deep in war. I had to be a Marine first just to survive." Despite the hardship of war, Casselli was able to depict soldiers and scenes of war in pencil sketches and paintings during his combat tour, artwork that is now part of the collection of the National Museum of the Marine Corps, in Washington, DC.

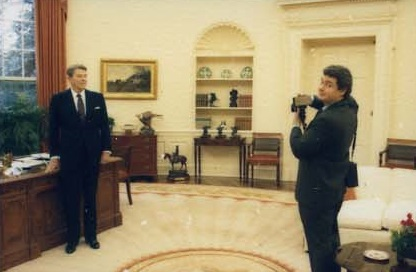
Casselli photographs Ronald Reagan in the Oval Office in 1988 in preparation for his portrait.

After being discharged from the Marine Corps in 1970, Casselli returned to New Orleans to learn that his mentor, John McCrady, was very ill. McCrady died within days of Casselli's return. Losing his mentor was a very difficult experience for Casselli, but it also signaled his coming of age as an artist.

After his return from combat, Casselli chose watercolor as his medium to reconnect with his native city, particularly focusing his attention on the life of African Americans in New Orleans. His work soon began to draw national attention, and in 1971

John Glenn, STS-95, by Henry Casselli

Casselli was awarded by the prestigious American Watercolor Society for his first submission. Over the next fifteen years, Casselli solidified his position as a master of the American watercolor, culminating in 1987 when he was awarded the Gold Medal of Honor by the American Watercolor Society, for the painting Echo. In 1988, he was elected into the National Academy of Design as an Associate member, and became a full member in 1994.

In addition to his work depicting the African Americans of New Orleans, Casselli has been commissioned for many portraits throughout his career. In 1980 and 1981, NASA commissioned him to serve as an official artist leading up to America's first Space Shuttle launch. Again, in 1998, NASA commissioned Casselli to portray John Glenn as he prepared for his historic final mission. Many of these works are part of the official collection of the National Air and Space Museum in Washington, DC.

Casselli was also commissioned for the official portrait of President Ronald Reagan, which he completed in 1988. The piece now hangs in the Hall of Presidents at the National Portrait Gallery in Washington, DC. His 1981 portrait of Muhammad Ali (called Cat's Cradle) also hangs in the National Portrait Gallery.
