= Paul Rickert =

American artist (born 1947)

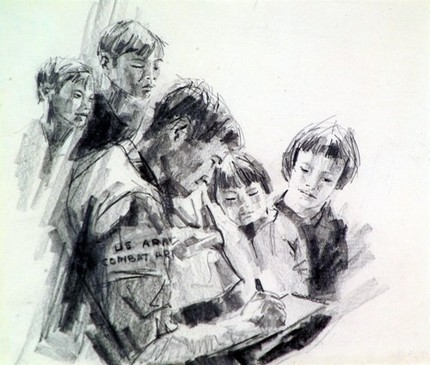
- Sketch of a Combat Artist at Work by Paul Rickert, Vietnam Combat Artists Program, CAT I, 1966. Courtesy of the National Museum of the U.S. Army.
- Born: Paul Rickert; June 21, 1945; Philadelphia, Pennsylvania
- Died: May 25, 2023 (aged 77); Doylestown, Pennsylvania
- Education: Art Center College of Design, Pasadena, CA.
- Known for: Painter
- Notable work: Sail, Hauling Traps, Ise au Haut, Red Victorian, Gates of Manayunk
- Awards: 1971 Windsor Newton Award, National Arts Club, New York, 1997 Charles Knox Smith Founders Prize, Woodmere Art Museum, Philadelphia, PA, 2000 Maybelle Longstreet Prize, Woodmere Art Museum, Philadelphia, PA

Paul Rickert (June 21, 1945 – May 25, 2023) was an American artist, known for his watercolor paintings of urban and industrial scenes.

== Early years and education ==
Paul Rickert was born in Philadelphia, Pennsylvania on June 21, 1945. Rickert, son of noted Philadelphia artist and illustrator, William Rickert, grew up along Wissahickon Creek, where 19th-century artists Thomas Moran and William Trost Richards painted in their youth. The Rickert household was permeated by art and music where Paul acquired a taste for classical music, especially compositions by Franz Joseph Haydn.

== Vietnam Combat Artists Program ==
At the age of 19, Rickert was drafted into the U. S. Army where he applied for assignment with the Vietnam Combat Artists Program. He was accepted and deployed to Vietnam in August 1966 where he was assigned to Combat Art Team I, serving from August 15, 1966, to December 15, 1966, under the supervision of Frank M. Sherman.

== Post-military art career ==
Following his discharge, Rickert enrolled in Art Center College of Design in Pasadena, California, graduating in 1974. During this time he also studied privately with artist Nelson Shanks. While still a student, Rickert's works garnered the 1972 Gold Medal of Honor from the Allied Artists of America and the 1972 Edgar Whitney Award from the American Watercolor Society.

In the Summer 1999 issue of Watercolor Magazine, Rickert explained the challenges of painting using the medium, "It is a very technical medium in that one needs to plan the whole painting before beginning to apply paint to paper. It works so fast and changes so radically, it's hard to control. Almost every step has to be anticipated, including the choice of brushes and colors. That is the key to watercolor."

Many of his pieces feature architectural elements, an interest Rickert developed as a student. He maintains a residence in Stonington, Maine, a location that has served as subject of much of his work as well including Mansard, Shadows, Red Victorian, Grand Night and Through Houses. Rickert became attracted to Maine after reading Eliot Porter's book, Summer Island, that included photographs of coastal Stonington and Penobscot Bay. In the 1970s, Rickert began spending summers in Stonington and nearby Brooksville, eventually buying a vacation home there.

His renderings of nocturnal scenes with soft illuminations and moonlit reflections have generated comparisons of his work with that of English Romantic landscape artist, watercolorist and printmaker, Joseph Mallord William Turner.

Rickert's scenes of industrial sites reflect the bustle of his native Pennsylvania, where he spends the other half of his time. Rickert's influences include Edward Hopper, Mark Rothko, Caspar David Friedrich, Nicholas Poussin and Richard Diebenkorn.

In February 2010, a selection of Rickert's industrial landscapes were featured at the exhibit, Industrial Visions at the Rider University Art Gallery. In an interview with Professor Harry I Naar, gallery directory, Rickert explained that he was influenced by the drama captured in the landscapes of 19th-century artist Joseph Mallord William Turner (April 23, 1775 – December 19, 1851), an English Romantic landscape painter, watercolorist and printmaker.

In June 2010, one of Rickert's watercolors was featured on the cover of the American Artist Magazine's special edition, "The Best of Watercolor".

== Awards ==
Rickert has received a number of awards including:

- Edith Ogden Harrison Award (Memorial Prize for Figure Painting) Woodmere Art Museum, Philadelphia, PA
- 1971 Windsor Newton Award, National Arts Club, New York
- 1973 Franklin Mint Gold Medal Award for Distinguished Watercolor Art, The Franklin Mint Gallery of American Art, Franklin Center, PA
- 1979 First Prize, Los Angeles Art Center College of Design, Los Angeles, CA
- 1997 Charles Knox Smith Founders Prize, Woodmere Art Museum, Philadelphia, PA
- 2000 Maybelle Longstreet Prize, Woodmere Art Museum, Philadelphia, PA
