= Mitchell Siporin =

Social Realist American painter

- Born: May 5, 1910; New York City
- Died: 1976 (aged 65–66); Newton, Massachusetts
- Known for: Painter
- Movement: Social Realism

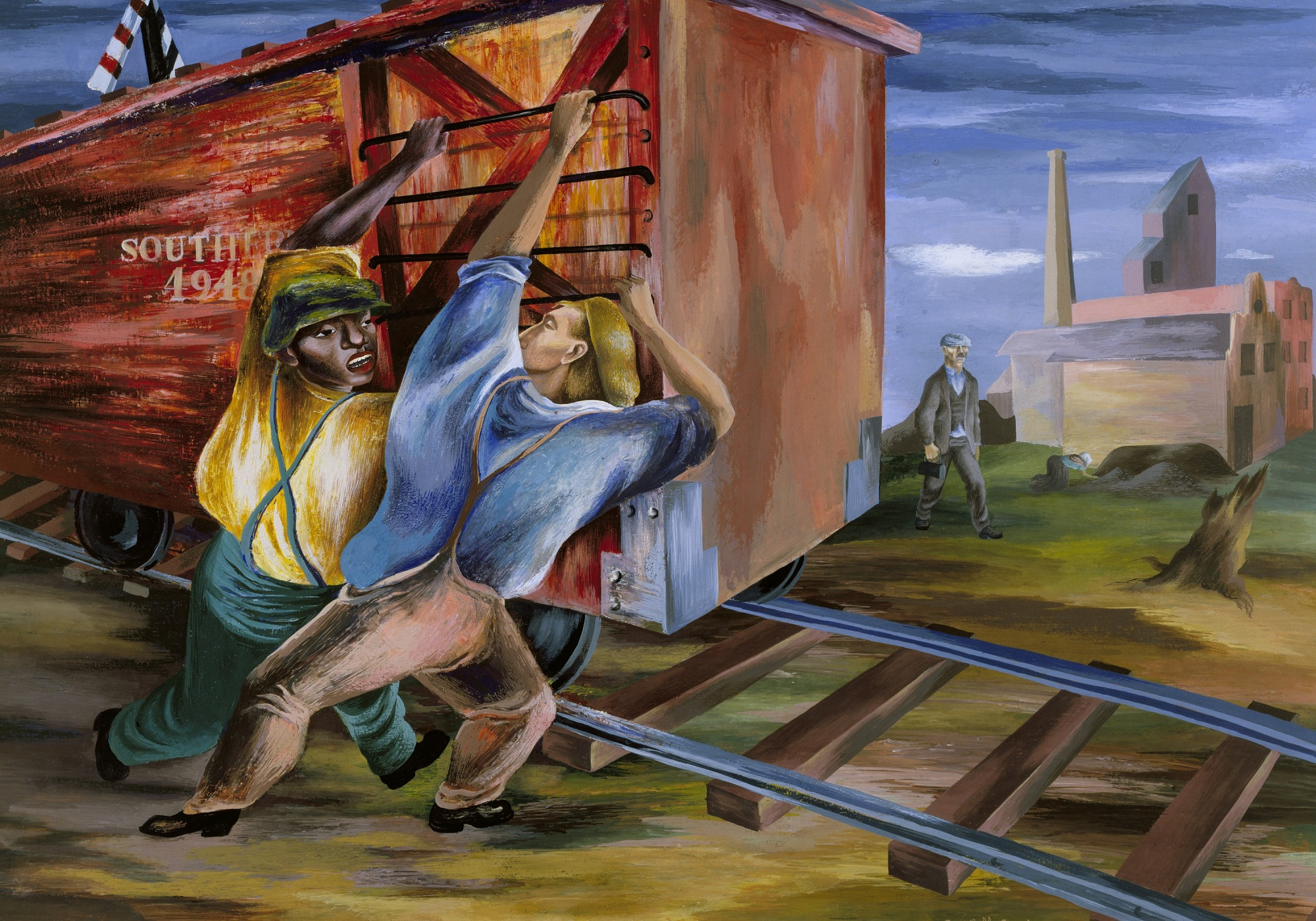
Back O' The Yards

Mitchell Siporin (1910–1976) was a Social Realist American painter.

== Biography ==
Mitchell Siporin was born on May 5, 1910, in New York City to Hyman, a truck driver, and Jennie Siporin, both immigrants from Poland, and grew up in Chicago. Siporin attended School of the Art Institute of Chicago. He did illustrations for Esquire and other magazines. Beginning in the mid-1930s, Siporin worked as a painter for the Illinois Art Project through the Works Progress Administration. Together with Edward Millman, he painted "the largest single mural project awarded for a post office by the Section of Fine Arts" in the Central Post Office in St Louis, Missouri.

In late 1943 he was deployed as a sergeant in the Army Artist Unit, where he served alongside Rudolph von Ripper. He sent back drawings and watercolours from North Africa and Italy.

He married Miriam Tane in Manhattan to November 9, 1945. He was the recipient of a Guggenheim Fellowship in 1945 and 1947. In 1949, he won the Prix de Rome in painting.

In 1951, he founded the Department of Fine Arts at Brandeis University. In 1956, he became the first curator of the Brandeis University Art Collection.

Siporin died in 1976 in Newton, Massachusetts. He was Jewish.

== Works ==
Siporin's work is in the collection of the Art Institute of Chicago, the Detroit Institute of Arts, the Metropolitan Museum of Art, the Museum of Modern Art, the National Gallery of Art, the Pennsylvania Academy of the Fine Arts, the Smithsonian American Art Museum, the Whitney Museum of American Art, and Albert G. Lane Technical High School in Chicago.

In 1947 his painting End of an Era won the Logan Medal of the Arts at the 51st Annual Exhibition in Chicago.

== See also ==
- Boston Expressionism
