= Rudolph von Ripper =

Austro-Hungarian-born American artist and soldier

Rudolph Charles von Ripper
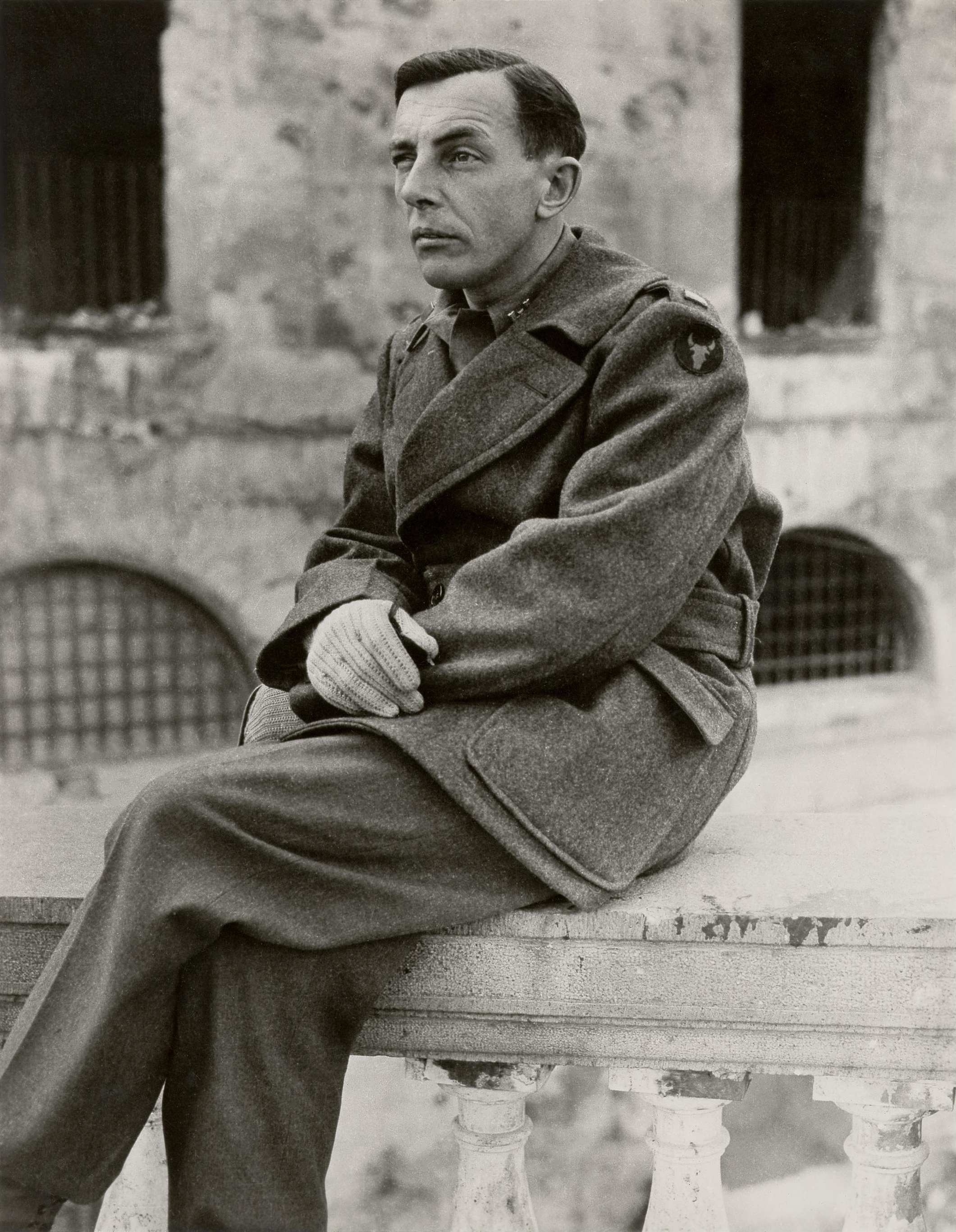
- In 1943, wearing the red bull shoulder badge of the US 34th Infantry Division
- Born: Rudolf Karl Hugo von Ripper; 29 January 1905; Kolozsvár, Austria-Hungary
- Died: 9 July 1960 (aged 55); Pollença, Mallorca, Spain
- Citizenship: Austrian (until 1941); American (from 1943)
- Occupations: Artist, soldier, OSS agent
- Spouses: Dorothea "Mopsa" Sternheim (m. 1929; div. 1947) (approx.) Evelyn Leege (m. 1947) (approx.)
- Military career
- Allegiance: France (1925–7); Spanish Republic (1936–7); United States of America (1942–5 or –60)
- Branch: French Foreign Legion (1925–7); Spanish Republican Air Force (1936–7); United States Army (1942–45); Office of Strategic Services (1945); (Central Intelligence Agency (1947–60, disputed))
- Rank: Captain
- Conflicts: Great Syrian Revolt; Spanish Civil War; World War II; North African campaign; Allied Invasion of Italy; Battle of Monte Cassino
- Awards: Silver Star & oak leaf; Purple Heart & oak leaf; Division citation

Rudolph Charles von Ripper (born Rudolf Karl Hugo von Ripper; (Note: After the abolition of the Austrian nobility in 1919, Austrian nobles were no longer entitled to use 'von' in their names. However, they were still able to use the honorific abroad and von Ripper continued to do so.) 29 January 1905 – 9 July 1960) was an Austrian-born American surrealist painter and illustrator, soldier and Office of Strategic Services (OSS) agent.

Born into Austro-Hungarian nobility, he left home after his father's death and studied at Kunstakademie Düsseldorf before joining the French Foreign Legion in 1925, with whom he fought in the Great Syrian Revolt. After deserting, he travelled to Berlin where he married designer Mopsa Sternheim and became part of Weimar culture, before leaving for Mallorca when the Nazis took power. In 1933 he returned to Berlin, where he was caught by the Gestapo with anti-Nazi publications and tortured in concentration camps until the Austrian government secured his release. He returned to Mallorca, where he created his most notable work, Écrasez l'infâme, before volunteering in 1936 to fight on the Republican side in the Spanish Civil War.

After being wounded in action he travelled to the United States, where he painted. Time magazine featured his art on its cover on two occasions, including the issue that named Adolf Hitler as 1938's Man of the Year. After the US joined World War II he applied to join the US Army, and after an initial rejection was accepted in late 1942 as a laboratory technician, but when the War Art Unit was created he was sent to North Africa as an Artist Correspondent. After that unit was defunded he transferred to the 34th Infantry Division as an intelligence officer, and took part in the Allied invasion of Italy, receiving promotion to lieutenant, a Silver Star with oak leaf cluster and a Purple Heart. He continued to paint, making sketches on the front lines then completing works while behind the lines or recovering from injuries.

Late in the war he was recruited by the Office of Strategic Services and parachuted behind German lines. After the war ended he continued to work for the OSS locating Nazi fugitives, until late 1945 when he was demobilised with the rank of captain; though some commentators believe that he continued to work for the Central Intelligence Agency. Having divorced Sternheim, he married Evelyn Leege and returned with her to Mallorca, where they became known for hosting glamorous parties until his sudden death in 1960. His work was largely forgotten after his death, but has undergone a reassessment since the discovery of his papers in the 1990s.

== Life ==
=== Early life ===
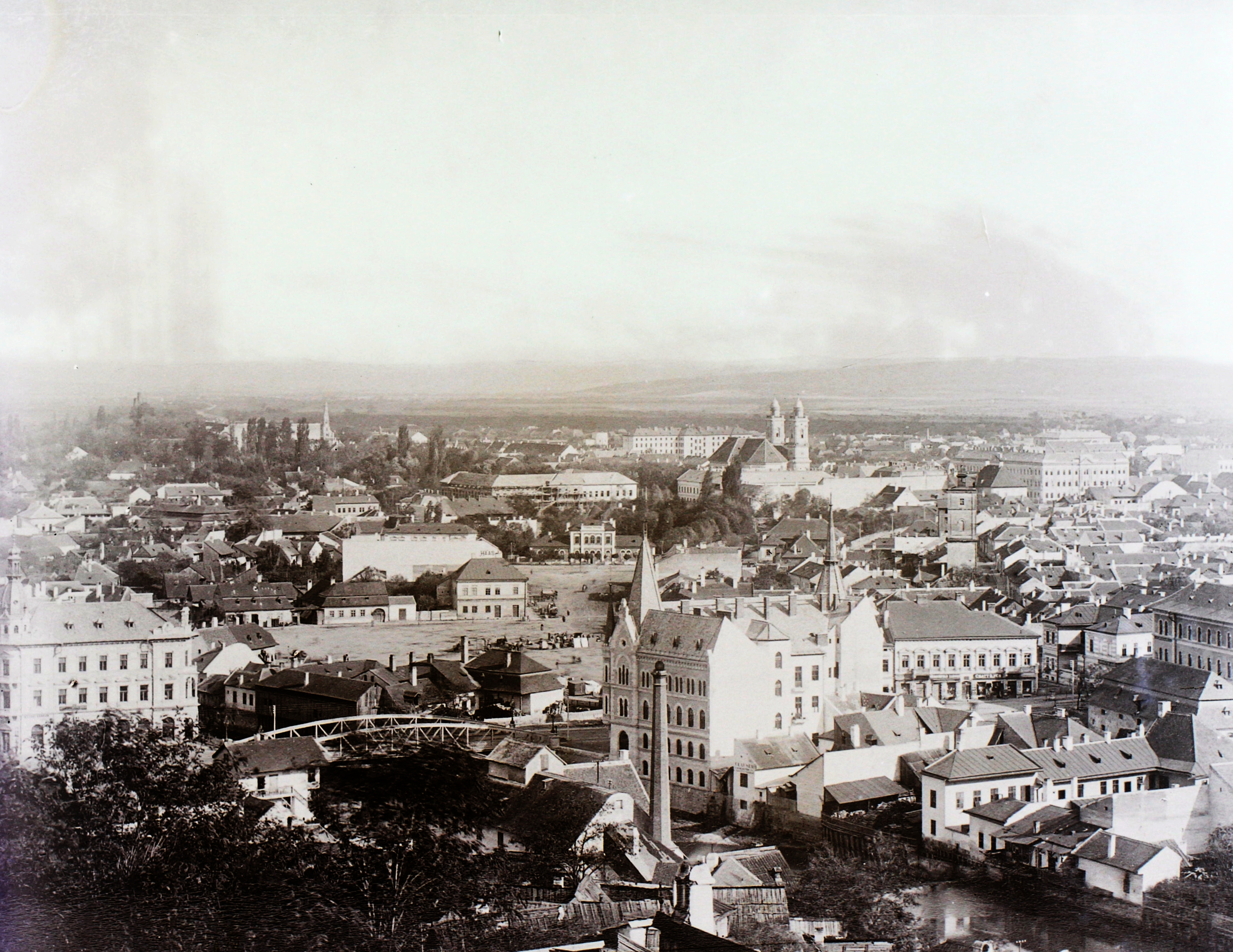
A 1900 view of von Ripper's birthplace Kolozsvár (now Cluj-Napoca)

Rudolf Karl Hugo von Ripper was born in 1905 in Kolozsvár (German: Klausenburg), Kingdom of Hungary, Austria-Hungary (now Cluj-Napoca, Romania). He was the son of Major General Eduard Maria Ritter von Ripper (1857-1918), an Austrian noble and general who was aide-de-camp to Charles I of Austria, and Countess Clara von Salis-Samaden.

He was born with strabismus, giving him very little vision in his right eye, but displayed artistic ability from a young age, drawing from the age of three, and received instruction in German expressionism. He also became skilled in horse-riding. However, his lack of discipline frustrated his father, who placed him in the Austrian court as a page.

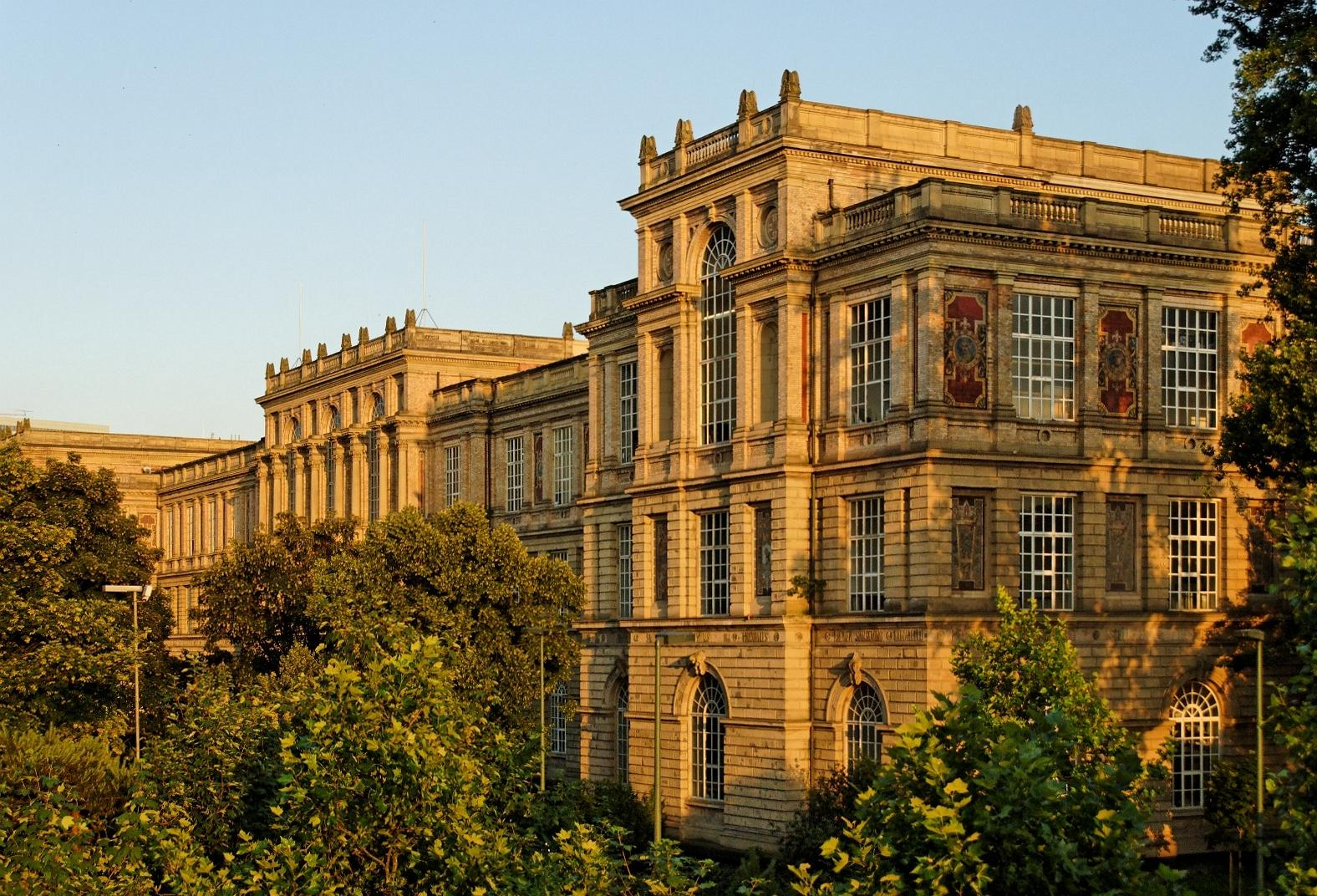
The Kunstakademie Düsseldorf where von Ripper studied

In October 1918, when von Ripper was 13, his father died from cancer. The same year saw the dissolution of Austria-Hungary, followed by the abolition of the Austrian nobility in 1919. Following these events, von Ripper left home and moved first to Innsbruck then to Berlin, where he worked in a saw mill, then as a circus clown. He then moved to Duisburg where he worked as a carpenter in a coal mine, which gave him the funds to enable him to study art at the Kunstakademie (art academy) in nearby Düsseldorf.

=== Paris and the French Foreign Legion ===
In 1923, von Ripper moved to Paris, where he painted, until he ran out of funds and moved to Lyon to seek work. In 1925, aged 19, he joined the French Foreign Legion for a five-year tour of duty. He was posted to Sidi El Hani in the French protectorate of Tunisia for training, then deployed against the Druze in the Great Syrian Revolt of 1925.

He found that it was difficult to find time for art in the Legion, and morale became low and desertion common due to the Legion's harsh treatment of the revolutionaries. During an ambush, he was shot in the knee and left lung, and evacuated back to Tunisia. In 1926, after serving less than two years, he deserted the Legion.

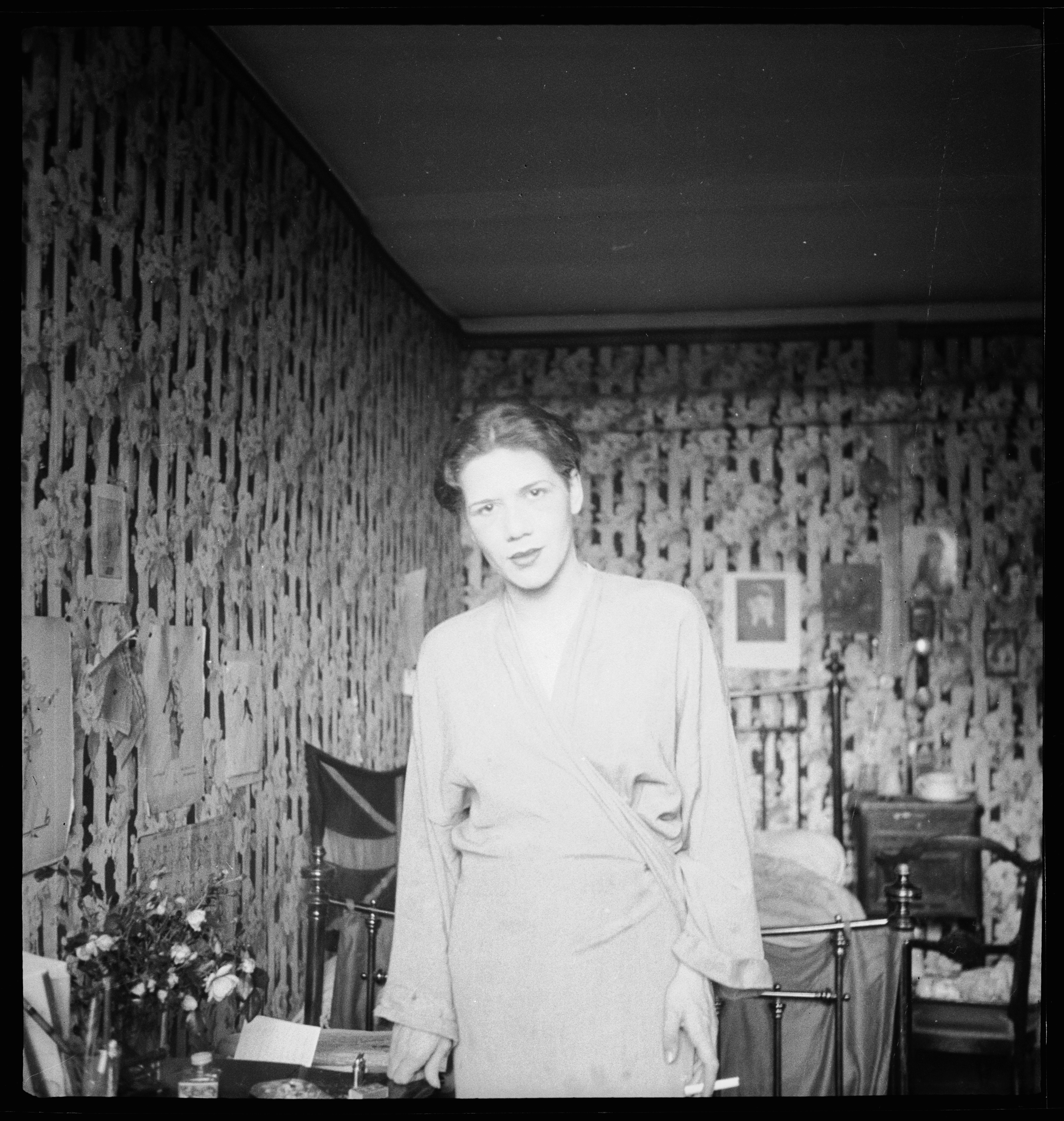
Mopsa von Ripper, photographed in 1933 by Annemarie Schwarzenbach

=== Berlin, the Far East and Mallorca ===
Having returned to Europe aboard a freighter, von Ripper travelled via Austria to Berlin, avoiding France. Later in the year he travelled to the Far East, intending to work as a filmmaker. While there, he became involved with an American gun-runner in China, and began to work for him. After the gun-runner was shot, von Ripper returned to Europe.

On his return to Berlin in 1929, he began a relationship with stage designer Dorothea "Mopsa" Sternheim, daughter of playwright Carl Sternheim. She was also in love with surrealist writer René Crevel, who also had feelings for von Ripper, and for a time there was a plan for a ménage à trois; however, this did not come about, and Sternheim and von Ripper married on 17 December 1929.

The couple settled in Berlin, where they were part of the Weimar culture of the city in the early 1930s. However, at some point during the 1930s the couple separated and Sternheim began seeing other men and women. Around 1933, von Ripper traveled to Mallorca, where he produced anti-fascist drawings to the commission of the German resistance.

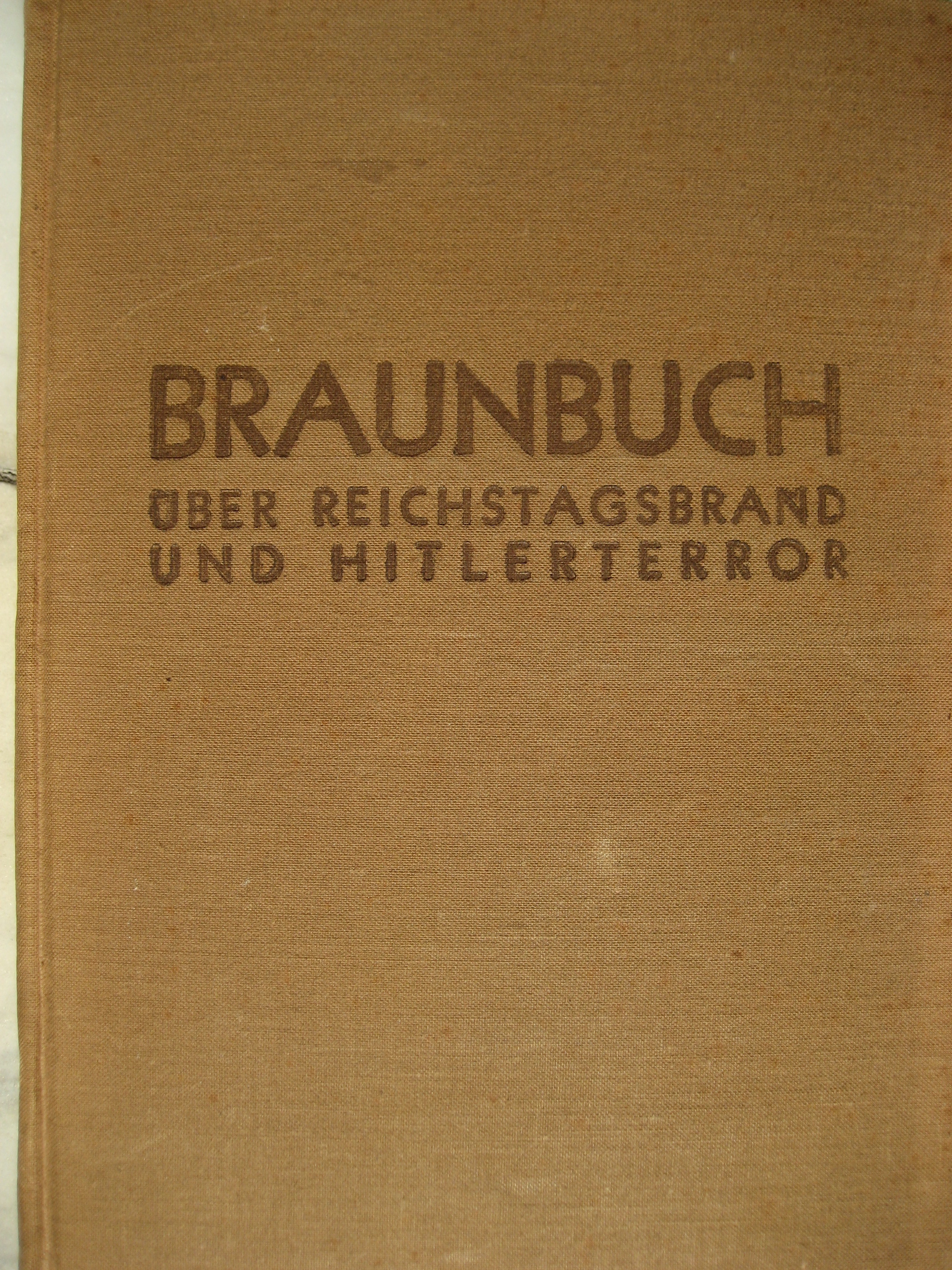
The 1933 Braunbuch on the Reichstag fire and Hitler terror, published by the Communist Party of Germany in Paris and imported by von Ripper into Germany

=== Arrest and internment in concentration camps ===
In October 1933, von Ripper returned via Paris to Berlin, now under Nazi rule, bringing with him copies of the Brown Book of the Reichstag Fire and Hitler Terror (Braunbuch), an anti-Nazi publication written by German left-wing groups in exile and published in Paris. He was taken to the office of Gestapo chief Rudolf Diels—who he had known socially in pre-Nazi Berlin—and accused of high treason for his production of anti-Nazi cartoons and possession of anti-Nazi literature.

He was imprisoned and tortured for some months, first at Columbia-Haus then at Oranienburg concentration camp. In 1934, he managed to get a message to Austrian Chancellor Engelbert Dollfuss, who intervened to have him released, with a requirement to leave all Nazi-held territories.

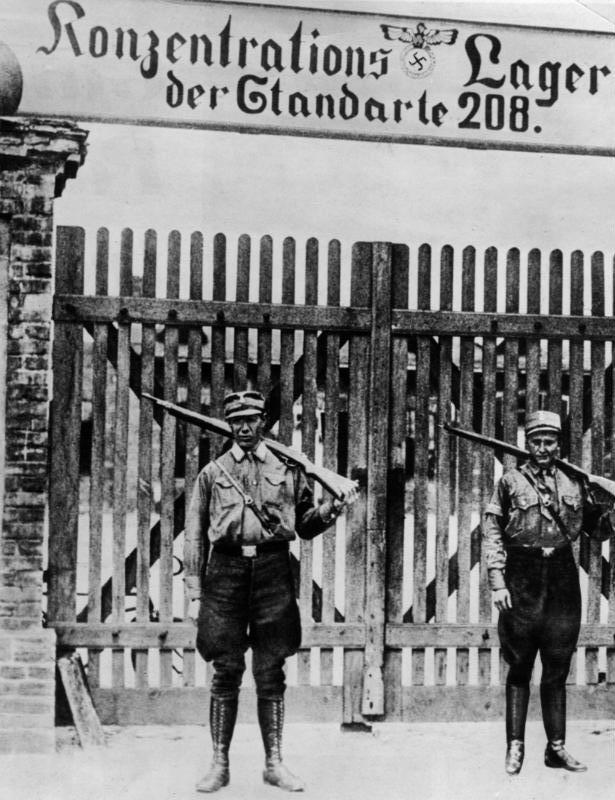
KZ Oranienburg, 1933

=== Return to Mallorca, Écrasez l'infâme and Spanish Civil War ===
On his ejection from Germany, von Ripper travelled first to Amsterdam, where he wrote anti-Nazi articles, then to Paris, where the Gestapo reported him for his earlier desertion from the Foreign Legion, but André Malraux intervened to secure his release.

Finally, he returned to Mallorca, where he created a series of pieces. In October 1935, fourteen of these were exhibited at the Tooth Gallery in London under the title "Kaleidoscope", and according to the New York Times "created a sensation in the art world". The German government described the works as "an insult to a friendly state" and ambassador Joachim von Ribbentrop asked that the show be censored, but British authorities refused. The drawings for the exhibition were intended for publication, but the originals disappeared from the printer. Von Ripper recreated the drawings as etchings on copper plates, which were published in Paris in a limited edition in 1938 under the title Écrasez l'infâme (To Crush Tyranny), a reference to Voltaire. Critics regard this suite of 16 prints as von Ripper's masterwork.

Roundel of the Spanish Republican Air Force, in which von Ripper served as an aerial gunner

After the outbreak of the Spanish Civil War in 1936, in which General Francisco Franco's coup was supported by troops from Nazi Germany, von Ripper joined the Republican Army, with the specific aim of fighting the Germans. In 1937, he was serving as an aerial gunner in the Spanish Republican Air Force when his plane was shot down and his left leg riddled with metal from a shell. He was told by doctors that his leg would have to be amputated, but left before they could do so.

=== Move to the United States, Time and Fortune magazines ===
In 1938, his health too damaged to fight further, he traveled to New York City, where he settled for a while in Greenwich Village and held exhibitions at the A.C.A and Bignou galleries. In 1939, he earned a residency at the Yaddo artists' community, before moving to New Canaan, Connecticut where he established an art studio in a century-old barn.

In January 1939, Time used von Ripper's picture captioned 'From the unholy organist, a hymn of hate', from Écrasez l'infâme, on the front cover of the issue which named Adolf Hitler as 1938's Man of the Year.

TIME's cover, showing Organist Adolf Hitler playing his hymn of hate in a desecrated cathedral while victims dangle on a St. Catherine's wheel and the Nazi hierarchy looks on, was drawn by Baron Rudolph Charles von Ripper, a Catholic who found Germany intolerable.

— Time magazine, Jan 2 1939

The issue also contained a profile of von Ripper and his art, under the heading 'Art: Enemy of the State'. Another picture by von Ripper, depicting German general Nikolaus von Falkenhorst, was used on the cover of Time magazine on 13 May 1940. During this period his art also began to appear in Fortune magazine. In 1939, he produced illustrations for Norman Corwin's book Seems Radio is Here to Stay, and in 1940 collaborated with Muriel Rukeyser on a long illustrated poem, The Soul and Body of John Brown.

In 1941, Rudolph—as well as Mopsa, who had remained in Europe—was officially stripped of his citizenship by the Nazi regime.

=== Service in the US Army ===
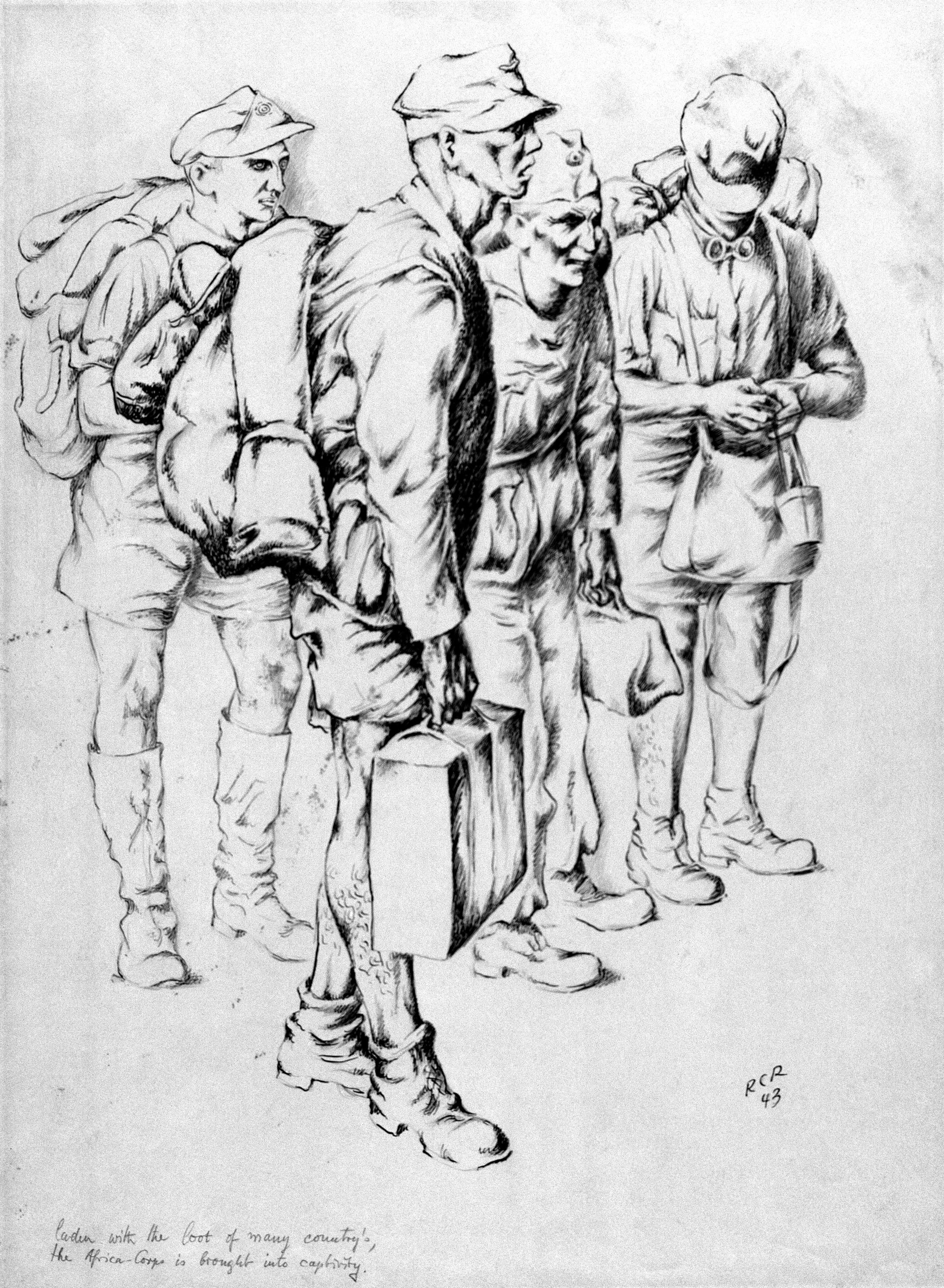
1943 drawing by von Ripper of Afrika Corps prisoners, captioned "laden with the loot of many country's [sic], the Africa-Corps is brought into captivity."

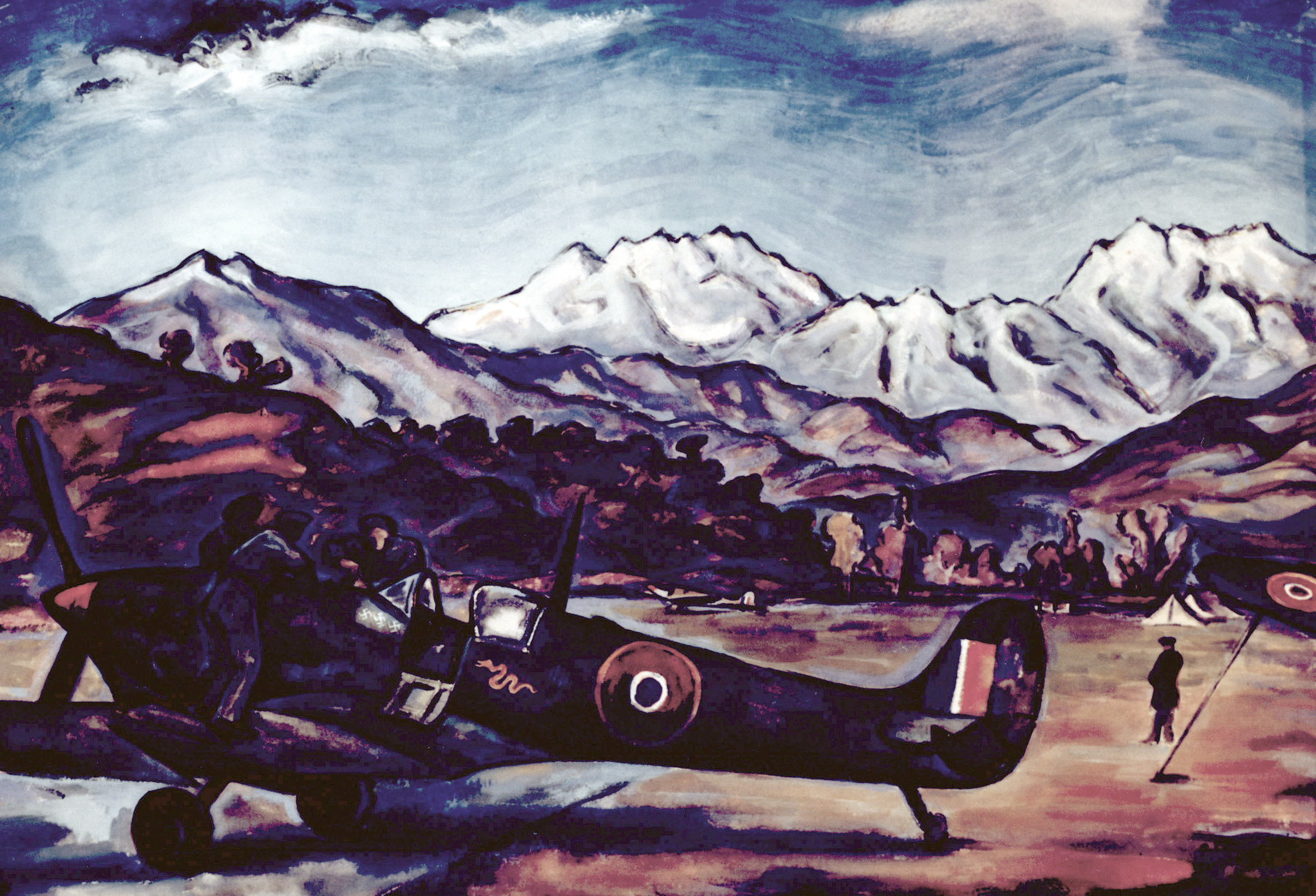
French Spitfire, Corsica, c. 1944

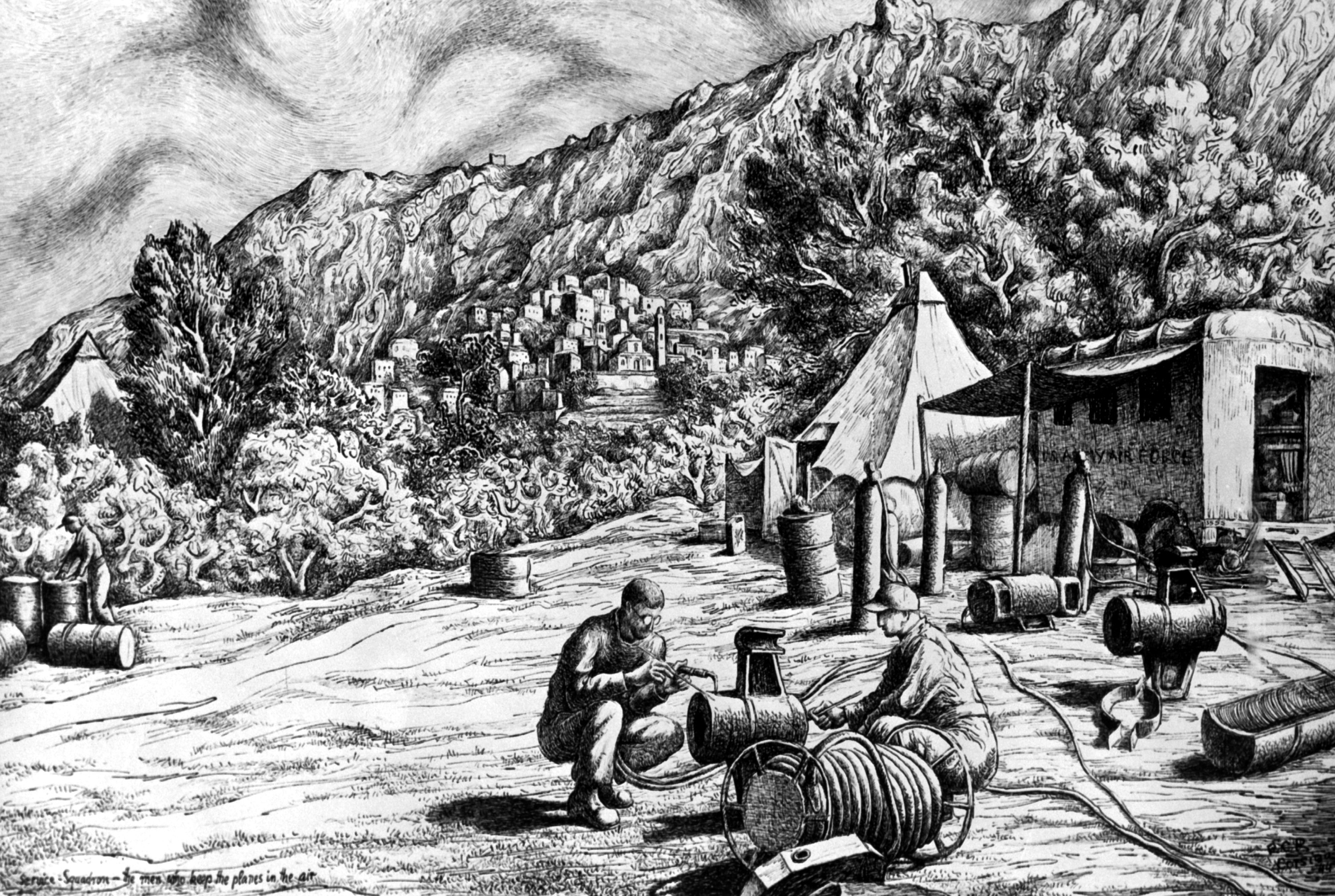
Service Squadron—the men who keep the planes in the air, 1944

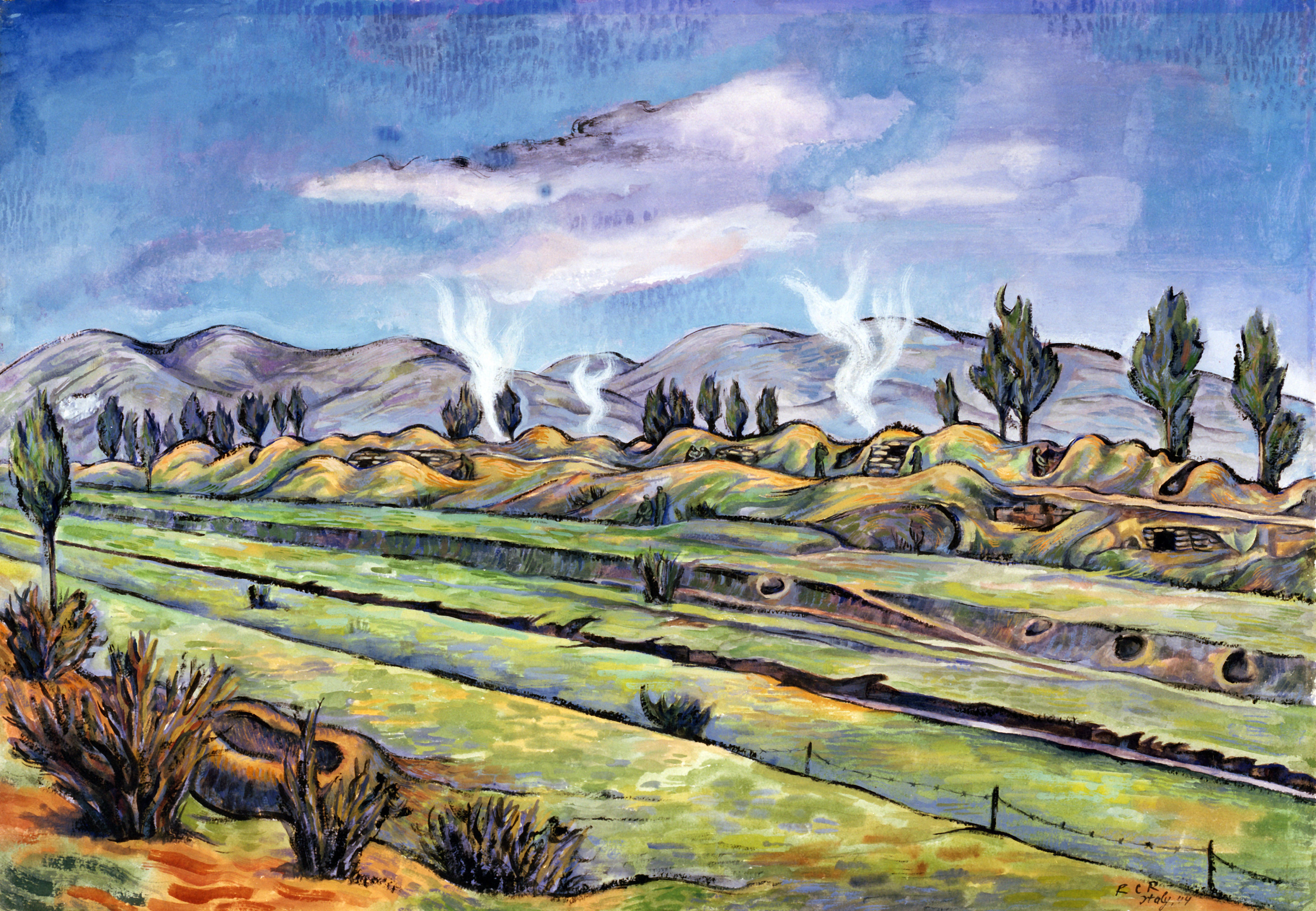
View of the Mussolini Canal, 1944

When the United States joined World War II, in 1941, von Ripper attempted to join the army as a soldier, but was initially rejected due to his health. Meanwhile, he painted propaganda posters intended for distribution abroad for the Office of War Information. In 1942 he also provided illustrations for the first edition of Selden Rodman's verse drama The Revolutionists.

Eventually, on 5 September 1942, he was admitted to the United States Army for 'limited service only' due to his wounds, and initially served as a hospital laboratory technician. He received basic medical training at William Beaumont Army Medical Center, El Paso, Texas, where he painted a still-surviving mural captioned "Our country's freedom and its people's way of life the soldier and sailor protect". On the formation of the Corps of Engineers War Art Unit in 1943, he transferred to that unit. On 9 April 1943, in a special hearing to enable him to be deployed overseas, he became a United States citizen, anglicizing his middle name to Charles, and on 12 April was sent to North Africa as an Artist Correspondent alongside Mitchell Siporin.

He worked alongside Pulitzer Prize-winning journalist Ernie Pyle, who in his 1944 book Brave Men wrote:

One of the most fabulous characters in that war theater was Lieutenant Rudolf Charles von Ripper. He was so fabulous, a man might have been justified in thinking him a phony until he got to know him. ... He was no phony. Von Ripper was the kind they write books about.

The Army Artist Unit was suddenly dissolved in May 1943, after coming under scrutiny from Congress and criticism from the press corps. Siporin's diary records that the decision came as a complete surprise to them and was described by von Ripper as "incredible". After enquiring about either obtaining a release from the army due to his age or transferring to intelligence work, von Ripper transferred to the Intelligence Section to interrogate prisoners.

He was assigned to the 34th Infantry Division, with whom he took part in the Invasion of Italy, and acquired the nickname "Jack the Ripper". In Italy, he served as acting intelligence officer of the 2nd Battalion of the 168th Infantry Regiment. He also led patrols against Nazi positions, either with squads of soldiers or alone. For actions in these sorties he was awarded a Silver Star and oak leaf cluster, and on 12 December 1943, was promoted to second lieutenant, which Siporin described as 'a battlefield appointment about which much should be said'. He also received a Purple Heart with oak leaf cluster and a Division Citation.

Von Ripper and one of his men advanced in the face of intense enemy fire and killed two and wounded three of the enemy, took 11 prisoners and captured numerous enemy weapons

— Citation for Oak leaf cluster to a Silver Star

He became sufficiently known for his audacity when leading patrols that his division forbade him going on patrol without specific permission. Combat cartoonist Bill Mauldin described him as a rare exception to infantrymen being "the kind that spends its time being miserable and scared in foxholes", saying he was driven by his hatred for the Nazis. Mauldin recounted tales of von Ripper obtaining intelligence by simply sneaking into a darkened German command post at night and demanding information in his "arrogant Prussian voice".

In a later sortie, he was ambushed and wounded in his right hand, left leg and face by machine gun bullets. He was taken to Naples to recover, where he continued to work on paintings based on his front line sketches. In November 1943, half his right index finger was amputated due to his wounds.

In December 1943, von Ripper's art was included in The Army at War, a War Department exhibition of combat art. In the catalog for the exhibition, he wrote:

A soldier-artist is a painter with a gun, a man to fight at times and to paint at other times. And in that he is very lucky: He can divert his effort from destruction, from killing, which is the soldier's job, to creative work, to build, make new things.

In February 1944 he returned to the front lines and was involved in the Battle of Monte Cassino.

=== OSS service ===
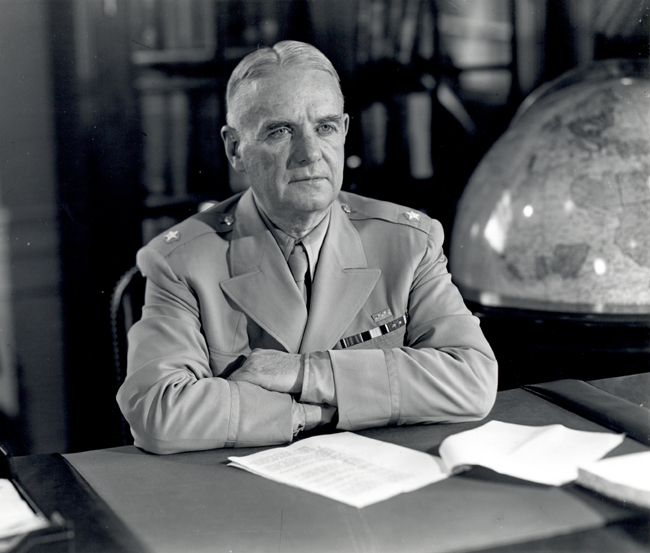
OSS director William J. Donovan, who recruited von Ripper in 1945

His exploits drew the attention of Office of Strategic Services (OSS) director William J. Donovan, and on 29 January 1945 he was released from duty in the 34th Infantry Division and recruited to the Secret Intelligence Branch of the OSS. He parachuted into Austria early in 1945 to organize resistance and inform the OSS about the situation.

Immediately after the end of the war in Europe, von Ripper was in Paris, where he re-encountered his long-separated wife Mopsa, who had been interred in the Ravensbrück concentration camp, and the two arranged to divorce. He was then involved in finding Gestapo and Nazi officials hiding in Austria. OSS agent Franklin Lindsay would later describe how von Ripper carried out a one-man hunt in the mountains behind Salzburg, leaving each morning dressed in lederhosen and carrying a hunting rifle, and returning each evening, usually with two or three Nazi prisoners he had found hiding in the forest.

He left the OSS in late 1945 with the rank of captain, though some commentators suggest he continued as an operative for the Central Intelligence Agency or the Counterintelligence Corps. His final OSS evaluation form assessed him as "Outstanding in fieldwork but too restless for staff work".

=== Return to civilian life ===
Having divorced Mopsa, he married art critic Evelyn (Avi) Leege, with whom he returned to his pre-war home in Connecticut. However, he initially struggled to create art in a peacetime context. He earned two Guggenheim Fellowships for fine art painting, in 1945 and 1947. He returned to Europe in 1946 and taught at the Academy of Fine Arts in Vienna, where he was involved with the Art-Club artists' association, often raising funds for their activities. In 1947, a portfolio of thirty of von Ripper's etchings was published in New York in 200 numbered editions, under the title With the 34th Infantry Division in Italy with a foreword from Major General Charles W. Ryder. The same year, his wartime painting Smoke Screen at Anzio Beachhead was lent by the Department of Defence to hang in the United States Capitol.

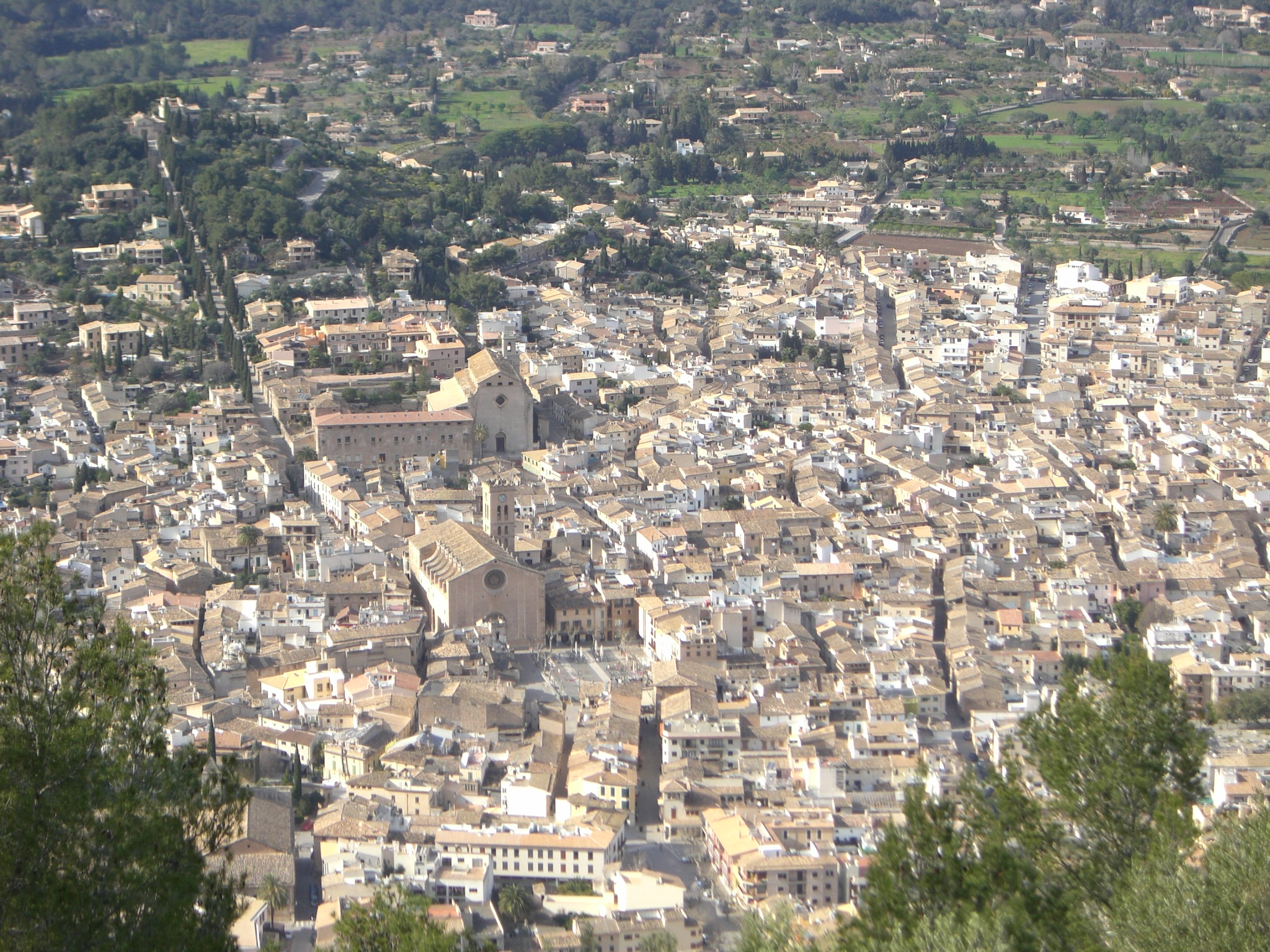
Pollença, Mallorca, where von Ripper lived from 1950 until his death

In 1950, Rudolph and Evelyn moved to a villa called Ca'n Cueg (House of the Frogs) near Pollença on Mallorca, despite the island still being under the Francoist regime that von Ripper had fought against in the 1930s. Shortly afterwards, former Nazi officer Otto Skorzeny moved in nearby. Their house became known for hosting glamorous parties with international guests. He also continued to create art, and staged an exhibition of paintings, etchings, tapestries, rugs and jewellery in Madrid in 1958, which was attended by the city's artistic and social elite including US ambassador John Davis Lodge.

In 1960, returning from a four-month trip, von Ripper was arrested by Spanish police and charged with smuggling. His wartime comrade C. L. Sulzberger, who had cautioned him against returning to Mallorca, believed that this might be the Spanish regime seeking revenge against him.

=== Death ===
On 9 July 1960, while on bail awaiting trial, von Ripper stepped outside the villa. He was found dead the following morning by Evelyn, with his death recorded as being from a heart attack, though some commentators including biographer Sian Mackay have considered the death suspicious. His obituary in The New York Times was headed, "Rudolf von Ripper, Artist, Dies; War Hero Served With O. S. S.". He is buried in the cemetery at Pollença.

== Legacy ==
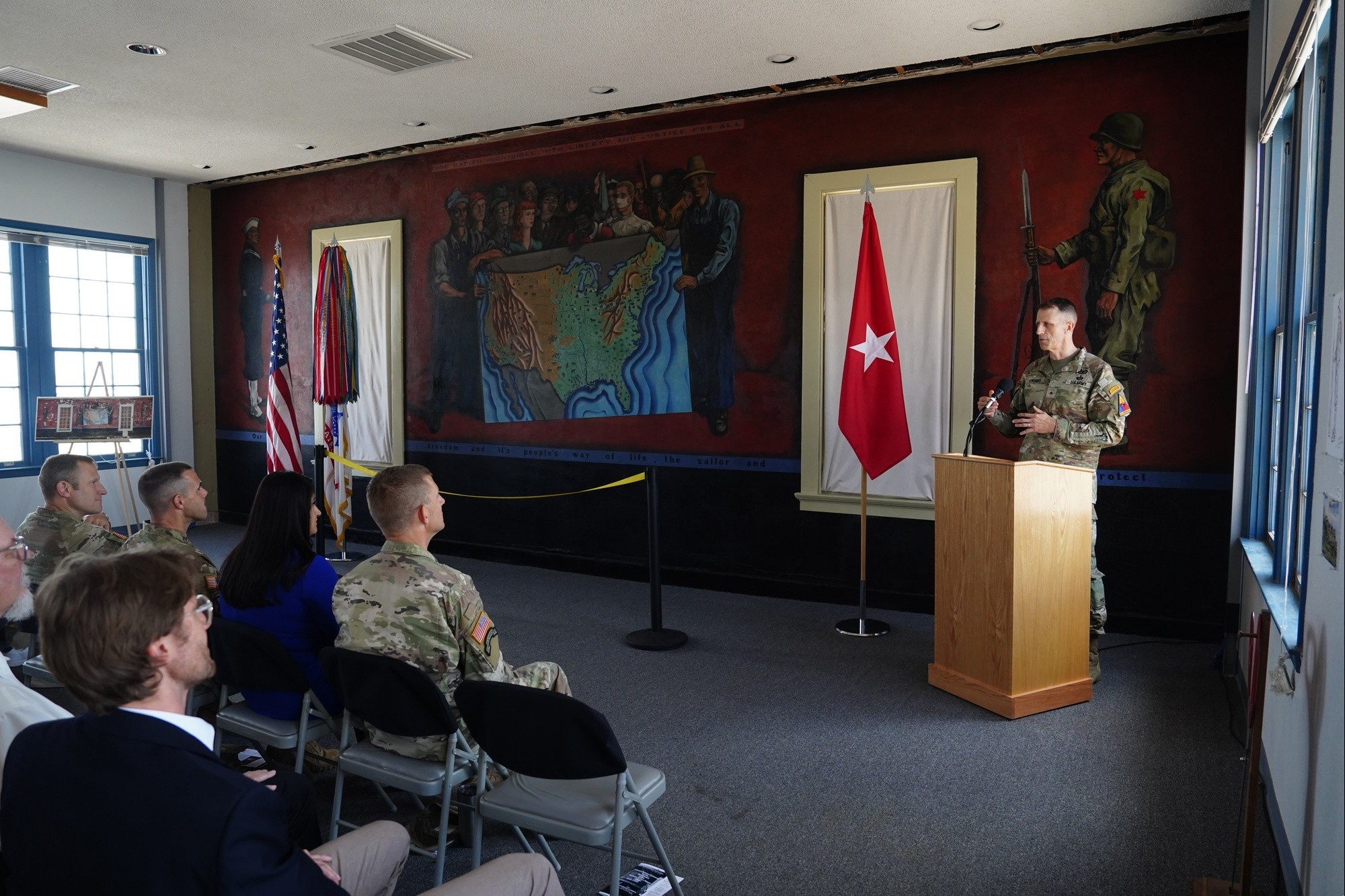
Unveiling of von Ripper's restored mural in El Paso, Texas, June 2025

While von Ripper's artwork, especially his pre-war and wartime work, was considered significant during his lifetime, after his death it fell from prominence.

In the 1990s, workers clearing out the Ca'n Cueg villa found a large number of papers and sketches belonging to von Ripper, which formed the basis of Sian Mackay's 2016 biography Von Ripper's Odyssey: War, Resistance, Art and Love. This led to a reconsideration of his art, including an exhibition in Edinburgh in 2017.

His mural at the former William Beaumont General Hospital in El Paso, Texas, captioned "Our country's freedom and its people's way of life the soldier and sailor protect", was walled up in 1994 for protection and not rediscovered until 2013. After a multi-year restoration, it was unveiled in June 2025.
