= United States Army Art Program =

U.S Army Program

The United States Army Art Program or U.S. Army Combat Art Program is a U.S. Army program to create artwork documenting its involvements in war and peacetime engagements. The art collection associated with the program is held by the U.S. Army Center of Military History. The United States Army Centre of Military History built the National Museum of the United States Army at Fort Belvoir that is now completed and will open when conditions allow.

== History ==
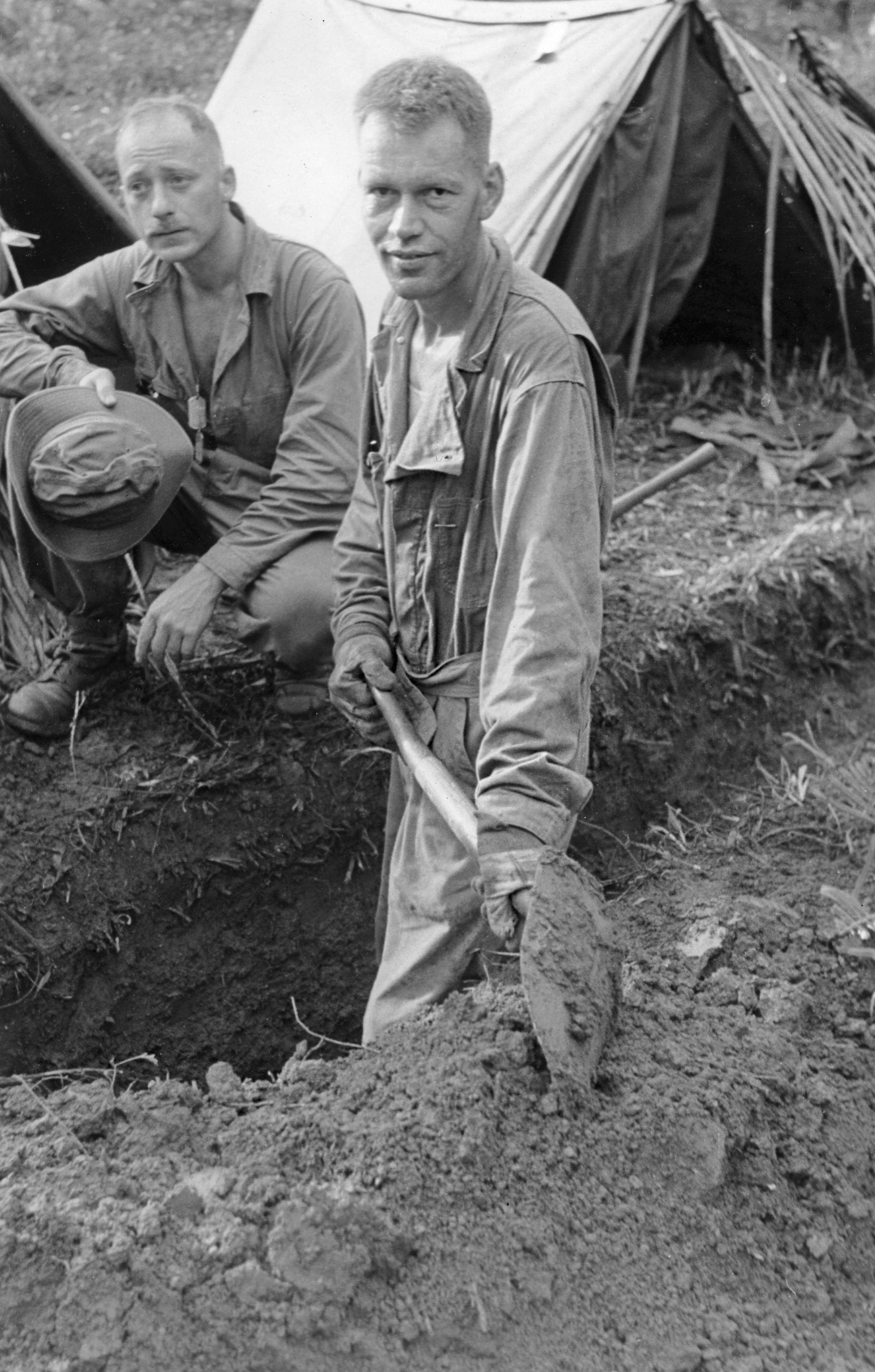
War Art Unit artists Aaron Bohrod (left) and Howard Cook with the U.S. Army on Rendova Island, June 1943

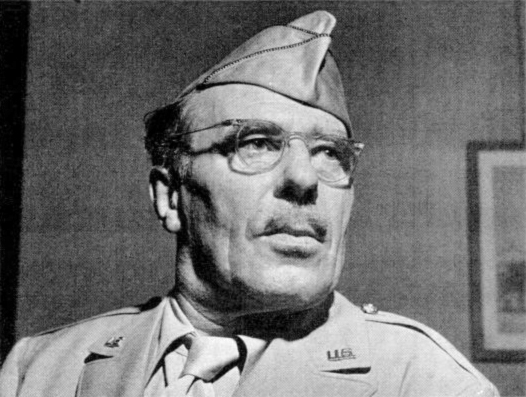
Lucien Labaudt was one of the War Art Unit artists who joined Life magazine when the program was abandoned. He was killed in a plane crash 12 December 1943, en route to China — the only Life artist-correspondent to die in the war.

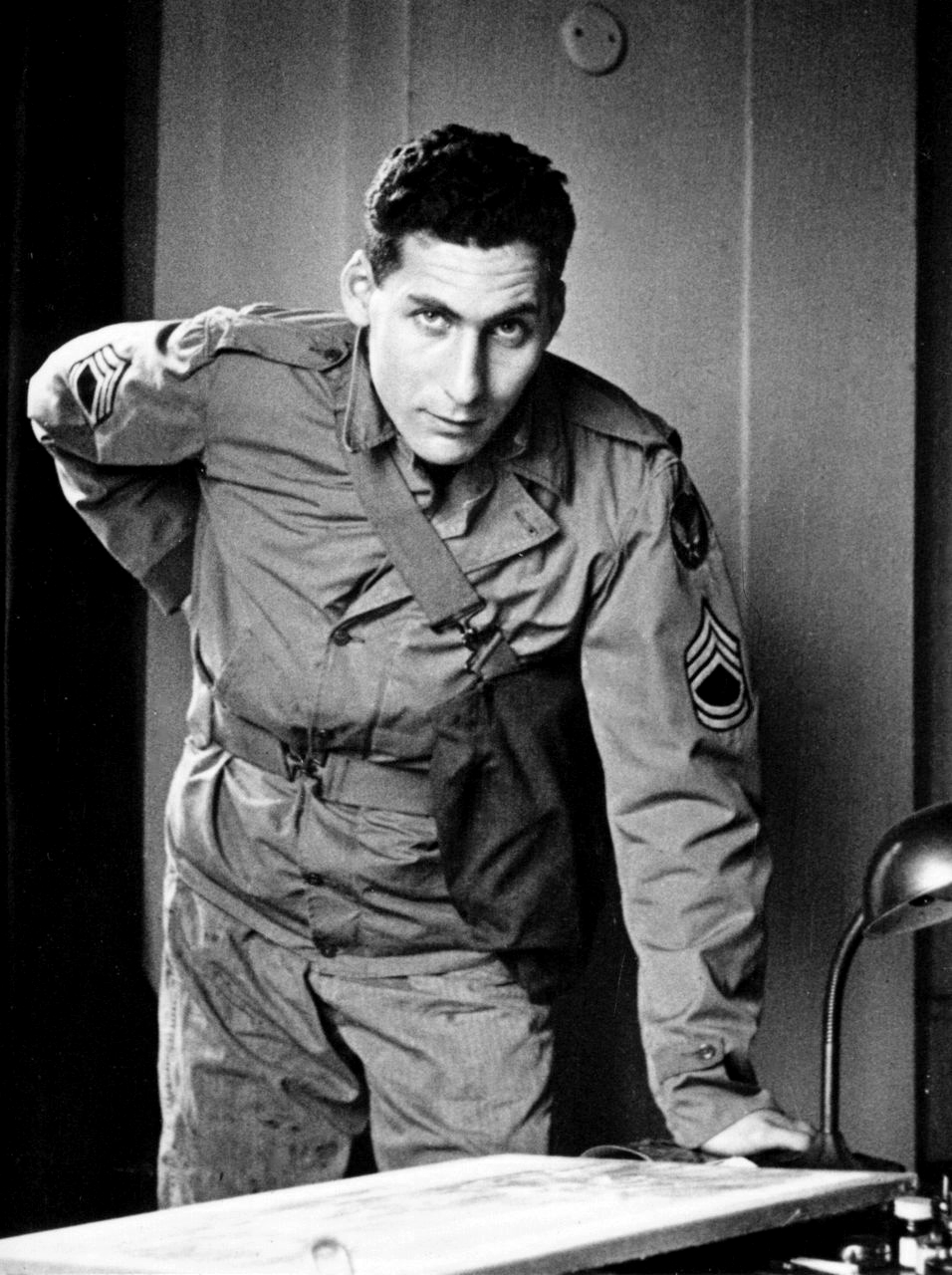
When the War Art Units were dissolved, Technical Sgt. Manuel Bromberg was reassigned to the Historical Section in London and could continue creating images of the war. He was one of the uniformed artists who formed the nucleus of an Army Combat Art Program within the Historical Branch of the War Department in 1944.

The U.S. Army's official interest in art originated in World War I when eight artists (see the list at AEF artists) were commissioned as captains in the Corps of Engineers and were sent to Europe to record the activities of the American Expeditionary Forces. At the end of the war, most of the team's artwork went to the Smithsonian Institution, which at that time was the custodian of Army historical property and art.

There was no Army program for acquiring art during the interwar years, but with the advent of World War II, the Corps of Engineers, drawing on its World War I experience, established the War Art Unit in early 1943. The Associated American Artists helped the Army recruit artists, and the War Department established a War Art Advisory Committee, a select group of civilian art experts who selected artists to work in the program. By the spring of 1943 the committee had selected 42 artists: 23 active duty military and 19 civilians. These artists included Aaron Bohrod, Howard Cook, Joe Jones, Jack Levine, Reginald Marsh, Mitchell Siporin, Rudolph von Ripper, Jack Keijo Steele, and Henry Varnum Poor. The first artists were sent to the Pacific Ocean theater of World War II, but in May 1943 Congress withdrew funding from the program and, by August 1943, it officially dissolved. The Army assigned the military artists to other units and released the civilians.

The effort to create a visual record of the American military experience in World War II was then taken up by the private sector in two different programs, one by Life magazine and one by Abbott Laboratories, a large medical supply company. When Life offered to employ civilian artists as war correspondents, the War Department agreed to provide them the same support already being given to print and film correspondents. Seventeen of nineteen civilian artists the War Art Committee had selected joined Life as war correspondents. A deal was struck between then editor of Life, Daniel Longwell, and the Secretary of War for the artists to receive the same treatment as news correspondents. Abbott, in coordination with the Army's Office of the Surgeon General, commissioned twelve artists to record the work of the Army Medical Corps. These two programs resulted in a wide range of work by distinguished artists, such as Marion Greenwood and John Steuart Curry, who had the opportunity to observe the war firsthand.

By the end of World War II, the Army had acquired over 2,000 pieces of art. In June 1945, the Army established a Historical Properties Section to maintain and exhibit this collection, thus creating the nucleus of today's Army art Collection. On 7 December 1960, Life also presented 1,050 works by its correspondents to the Defense Department, many of which the Army later received. In 1947, the Army Art program also assumed custody of 8,000 German war art created by similar Nazi programs, including four architectural renderings by Adolf Hitler.

=== Official Army Art Program ===
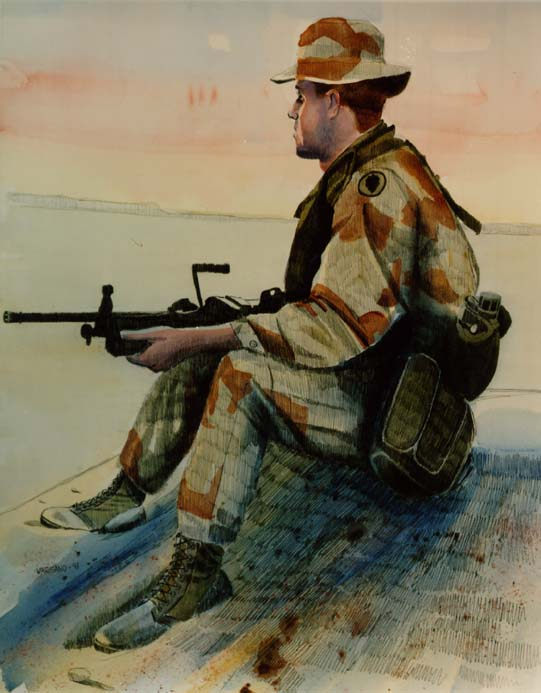
On Guard at Sunset (1991) by SFC Peter G. Varisano, an example of a painting made for the United States Army Collection

War art continued through subsequent wars, including the Korean War, Vietnam War, Desert Storm/Desert Shield and the global war on terrorism as well as other operations by the Army. Although no official artists were forwarded to Korea by the Army, nine combat artists teams operated in Vietnam from 1966 to 1970 as part of the U.S. Army Vietnam Combat Artists Program. The Chief of Military History developed the Army Art Program as it is today, with specialized training for both civilian and military artists who went into the field as complete units. As of November 2010, the Army Art collection comprises over 15,500 works of art from over 1,300 artists. The Army Staff Artist Program was assigned to the United States Army Center of Military History Museum Division in 1992, where it was established as a permanent part of the Museum Division's Collections Branch.

=== Public showings ===
In September 2010, the National Constitution Center in Philadelphia, Pennsylvania, hosted an exhibit titled "Art of the American Soldier", featuring more than 300 works from the army art collection, one of the first times that the Army Art from the Army Art Program had been put on display en masse. In addition to the 300 works, soldier/artists were also allowed to submit works to be part of digital kiosks at the exhibit. The exhibit was designed to contain highly realistic works, such as those of U.S. Army artist Master Sergeant Martin Cervantez. Cervantez commented on his pieces on display in Reuters on the nature of the exhibit: "If a soldier takes his family to the museum, I want them to be able to say, 'That's what it was like.'"

== See also ==
- United States Air Force Art Program
- American official war artists
- West Point Museum
