= Howard Wood Field =

Sports field in Sioux Falls, South Dakota

Coordinates: 43°33′35.32″N 96°45′10.13″W

- Location within South Dakota Location within the United States
- Interactive map of Howard Wood Field
- Location: 2000 W Russell St, Sioux Falls, South Dakota
- Owner: Sioux Falls School District
- Operator: Sioux Falls School District
- Capacity: 10,000
- Surface: FieldTurf

Construction
- Opened: 1957
- Renovated: 2003; 2012; 2017

Howard Wood Field is a stadium in Sioux Falls, South Dakota, constructed in 1957. Holding 10,000 people, it is one of the premier football, soccer and track facilities in the region. Field turf was installed to replace the natural grass after a renovation project in 2003.

== Events ==
Howard Wood Field is host to the Howard Wood Dakota Relays, an extended weekend of collegiate and High School track and field, and soccer competition. Howard Wood Field served as host for the Bob Burns Dakota Bowl, an annual fundraiser for O'Gorman High School, which is a Catholic school in Sioux Falls, South Dakota, the event has now since moved to O'Gorman's Mac Field. The Bob Burns Dakota Bowl is focused around a football game between O'Gorman High School and another team chosen on a year by year basis. Additionally, Howard Wood Field is also host to the President's Bowl football games. The President's Bowl serves as a fundraiser for extra curricular activities for the Sioux Falls, South Dakota public High Schools. From 1993 through 2006 over $1.3 million has been raised from this annual set of football games. The stadium also serves as host to other track events as well as marching band for competitions.

Howard Wood Field also serves as the home football stadium for all four Sioux Falls Public High Schools (Washington, Lincoln, Roosevelt, and Jefferson).

The Minnesota Vikings played their first game, an exhibition against the Dallas Cowboys on August 5, 1961, at Howard Wood Field. Legendary local football coach, Bob Burns, promoted the game.

On September 26, 2007, Augustana College announced it would no longer call Howard Wood Field home, after a $6.1 million donation was given to allow the college to build an on-campus football facility, called the Kirkeby–Over Stadium. The school played at Howard Wood Field from 1958 to 2008.
