= Allison Hedge Coke =

American poet and editor (born 1958)

Allison Adelle Hedge Coke
- Born: August 4, 1958 (age 68); Amarillo, Texas, United States
- Occupations: Poet, writer, artist, performer, filmmaker, educator, professional organizer
- Writing career
- Genres: Poetry, creative nonfiction, fiction, script, lyrics
- Notable works: Dog Road Woman; Rock, Ghost, Willow, Deer; Off-Season City Pipe; Blood Run Streaming
- Notable awards: American Book Award, King/Chavez/Parks Award
- Website: allisonhedgecoke.com rdkla.com

Allison Adelle Hedge Coke (born August 4, 1958) is an American poet and editor. Her debut book, Dog Road Woman, won the American Book Award and was the first finalist of the Paterson Poetry Prize and Diane DeCora Award. Since then, she has written five more books and edited eight anthologies. She is known for addressing issues of culture, prejudice, rights, the environment, peace, violence, abuse, and labor in her poetry and other creative works.

== Early life and education ==
Coke was born in Amarillo, Texas, to a family she says were of French-Canadian, Alsatian, English, Irish, Welsh, Portuguese, Cherokee, Huron, and Muscogee descent. She self-identifies as Native American despite not being enrolled in any Native tribe, and wrote her paternal grandfather Vaughn "refused tribal enrollment for himself and his children" to protest the "diabolical Dawe's Act". The Tribal Alliance Against Frauds published her genealogy back to 1712 showing no Native American or First Nations ancestors.

Hedge Coke had a very non-traditional childhood educational experience, dropping out of high school to work in the crop fields to provide for herself. She then completed her GED at age 16 where she shortly after began taking community education classes at North Carolina State University, studying photography, traditional arts, and writing. Hedge Coke studied performance, directing and tech at Estelle Harmon's Actors Workshop, and went on to earn an AFAW in creative writing from the Institute of American Indian Arts (IAIA summer exchange fellow at Jack Kerouac School of Disembodied Poetics Summer Writing Program), and an MFA in poetry from Vermont College.

== Career ==
She held a National Endowment for the Humanities Distinguished Visiting Professor/Writer appointment for Hartwick College (2004). She is an original and emeritus fellow of the Black Earth Institute Think-Tank, a MacDowell Colony for the Arts Fellow, a Hawthorden Castle Fellow, a Soul Mountain Fellow, a Weymouth Center for the Arts and Humanities Fellow, a Lannan Foundation residency fellow, and a current University of Nebraska–Lincoln Center for Great Plains Studies Fellow (flagship campus). She served as the Distinguished Paul W. Reynolds and Clarice Kingston Reynolds Endowed Chair in English, and as an Associate Professor of Poetry & Creative Writing in the English Department of the University of Nebraska at Kearney (2007–2012) and University of Nebraska low-residency MFA program (2007–current).

She was visiting Artist of the University of Central Oklahoma (2012–2014), and a Distinguished Writer in Residence at the University of Hawaii at Manoa (2014). She has also served as a Visiting Writer for the University of California Riverside (2014) and University of California Riverside–Palm Desert (2008), and taught for Northern Michigan University, the University of Arkansas, Lenoir-Rhyne University, Kilian College, and the University of Sioux Falls. Hedge Coke is a founding faculty member of the low residency Vermont College of Fine Arts MFA program in Writing and Publishing (2015–), teaches for Oklahoma City University's Red Earth MFA (2016–), and is visiting faculty for the Summer Writing Program at Naropa University. She has directed the annual Literary Sandhill Crane Retreat, in conjunction with her studies in migration patterning influence on flyway communities, since 2007. Hedge Coke is a distinguished professor of creative writing at the University of California, Riverside.

== Poetry ==
Hedge Coke's work Blood Run, a free verse poetry collection of 66 poems, was inspired by the traditions of the Native American Mound Builders and their earthworks. Blood Run revives the history of the sites giving profound voice to humans, animals, plants and structures, also with political-ecological hope for the future to preserve ancient spiritual places. The poems show a mathematical patterning based on the numbers four, three and seven and on the sequence of the first 24.primes. In Hedge Coke's Streaming, the poem, America I sing you back was born not out of anger but concern for what she saw happening in the United States 12 years ago, alarmed by the greediness of politicians to take natural resources from the land. America I sing you back can be interpreted as an alternate view to the identity of America, following in the footsteps of Walt Whitman's poem, I Hear America Singing and Langston Hughes, I too. In 2022, she published Look at This Blue, which was longlisted for the 2022 National Book Award for Poetry.

== Discography ==
- Streaming, Long Person Records (Yvwi Gvnahita), with trio project Rd Klā (album)

== Bibliography ==
- Burn (Illustrated by Dustin Mater), MadHat Press, 2017 (Poems) ISBN 1941196454
- Effigies III, Editor, Salt Publishing, UK, 2019 ISBN 9781784631833
- Streaming, Coffee House Press (poems). ISBN 978-1-56689-375-6
- Effigies II: An Anthology of New Indigenous Writing. Editor, Salt Publishing. 2014 Native America Calling Book of the Month
- Rock, Ghost, Willow, Deer, University of Nebraska Press (memoir, paperback edition), ISBN 978-0-8032-4846-5
- Sing: Poetry of the Indigenous Americas, Editor, University of Arizona Press. 2011.
- Effigies: An Anthology of New Indigenous Writing, Pacific Rim, Editor, Salt Publishing. 2009.
- Acquisition editor: Bone Light by Orlando White, Red Hen Press. 2009.
- Ahani: Indigenous American Poetry, Editor, Oregon State University.
- Blood Run, Salt Publishing (free verse play poems) ISBN 1844712664
- Off-Season City Pipe, Coffee House Press (poems) ISBN 978-1-56689-171-4
- From the Fields, editor, California Poets in the Schools Press.
- Rock, Ghost, Willow, Deer, University of Nebraska Press (memoir) ISBN 978-0-8032-1527-6
- They Wanted Children, editor, Sioux Falls School District Press. (Sioux Falls School District (South Dakota))
- Coming to Life, editor, Sioux Falls School District Press, (Sioux Falls School District)
- Dog Road Woman : Poems, ISBN 978-1-56689-061-8, Coffee House Press.
- Year of the Rat, (Chapbook) Grimes Press.
- It's Not Quiet Anymore: New Work from the Institute of American Indian Arts, Co-Senior Editor with Heather Ahtone, Institute of American Indian Arts Press.
- Voices of Thunder: New Work from the Institute of American Indian Arts, Co-Senior Editor with Heather Ahtone, Institute of American Indian Arts Press.

=== In anthology ===
- Melissa Tuckey, ed. Ghost Fishing: An Eco-Justice Poetry Anthology. University of Georgia Press, 2018.

=== Books edited or co-edited ===
- Effigies III, Editor, Salt Publications, UK, 2019 ISBN 9781784631833
- Effigies II: An Anthology of New Indigenous Writing. Editor, Salt Publishing. 2014
- Sing: Poetry of the Indigenous Americas, Editor, University of Arizona Press. 2011.
- Effigies: An Anthology of New Indigenous Writing, Pacific Rim, Editor, Salt Publishing. 2009.
- Bone Light by Orlando White, series editor, Red Hen Press. 2009.
- From the Fields, Editor, California Poets in the Schools Press.
- Ahani: Indigenous American Poetry", Editor, Oregon State University. Oregon State University.
- They Wanted Children, editor, Sioux Falls School District Press. Sioux Falls School District (South Dakota) Sioux Falls School District (South Dakota) Poems and stories of coping. The Lost Boys from Sudan, American Indian students, Immigrant...
- Coming to Life, editor, Sioux Falls School District Press. Sioux Falls School District (South Dakota). Sioux Falls School District (South Dakota) Poems of Peace After 9–11.
- It's Not Quiet Anymore: New Work from the Institute of American Indian Arts, Co-Senior Editor with Heather Ahtone, Institute of American Indian Arts Press. Institute of American Indian Arts Press.
- Voices of Thunder: New Work from the Institute of American Indian Arts, Co-Editor with Heather Ahtone, Institute of American Indian Arts Press.

== Awards ==
- Witter Bynner Fellowship Appointed by the US Poet Laureate, Juan Felipe Herrera, 2016.
- Winner: 2015 IPPY Award – Bronze Medal (Independent Publisher Book Awards)
- Four Pushcart Prize nominations in 2009 for work published in 2008.
- Fellow University of Nebraska–Lincoln Center for Great Plains Studies. 2008–current.
- South Dakota Arts Council Collaborative Grant in 2008–9.
- Paul Hanly Furfey Lecture. An Endowed Lecture. Association for the Sociology of Religion. Boston, MA. 2008.
- Journal of the Year Editor in 2006–2007 Wordcraft Circle of Native Writers and Storytellers To Topos International Journal of Poetry Ahani: Indigenous American Poetry Oregon State University. 2008.
- King Chavez Parks Teaching Award Northern Michigan University. 2005.
- South Dakota Arts Council Artist Fellowship 2002.
- Excellence in Teaching Awards Sioux Falls Area Community Foundation. 2002 and 2004.
- South Dakota Arts Council Individual Artist Project Grants/Fellowships 1999, 2002.
- South Dakota Arts Council Artist in Residence 1998–current.
- Abiko Quarterly Editor's Choice Award. Cid Corman, Editor. 1995.
