= Washington High School (Sioux Falls, South Dakota) =

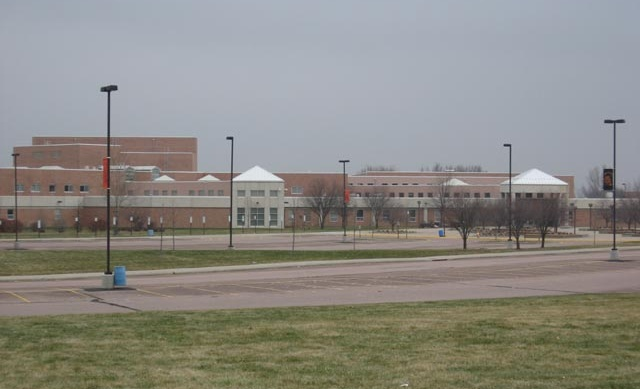

Location
- 501 N. Sycamore Ave; Sioux Falls, South Dakota 57110; United States; 43.553°N 96.674°W

Information
- School type: Public, Secondary
- Motto: To develop life-long learners to succeed in a changing world
- Established: 1908
- School district: Sioux Falls School District
- Superintendent: Jane Stavem
- Principal: Kari Papke
- Teaching staff: 123.85 (on FTE basis)
- Grades: 9–12
- Enrollment: 1,810 (2025-2026)
- Student to teacher ratio: 15.01
- Colors: Orange and Black
- Athletics conference: SDHSAA
- Mascot: Warrior
- Rival: Lincoln High School
- Information: 605-367-7970
- Website: www.whs.sf.k12.sd.us/o/whs
- Washington Warriors athletic logo

Washington High School (commonly Washington, Washington High, or WHS) is a public secondary school located in Sioux Falls, South Dakota with an enrollment of 1,910 students. The school is part of the Sioux Falls School District, and is one of four public high schools in Sioux Falls.

Founded in 1908, Washington High School succeeded Central School and Irving High School as the city's predominate secondary public school, built to accommodate a larger student capacity. In 1992 the school transferred from its downtown location to its current site, with the previous building remodeled to become the Washington Pavilion of Arts and Science.

Washington High was included in Newsweek's 2008 online edition of the top 1,300 public high schools in America, ranking at 1,230; below Lincoln High School (at 1,070) and above Roosevelt High School (at 1,274). As of 2009, however, Washington High was the only school to receive U.S. News & World Report's silver medal high school ranking in South Dakota. The school's class of 2009 also was the only school to achieve a minimum level of proficiency among all groups tested on the South Dakota STEP, a standards-based test designed to meet NCLB requirements.

== History ==
Construction of Washington High School began in 1904, after Central School in Sioux Falls was outgrown. Upon completion in 1908, it was renamed from "Sioux Falls High School" to Washington High School. Three hundred twenty-eight high school students enrolled into the new building on February 14, 1908.

The students soon outgrew the building. With a high school population of 536 in 1911, the enrollment exceeded the maximum capacity of 500. With the addition of a new South Wing to Washington High in 1922, the enrollment grew from 959 in 1921 to 1,660 in 1930.

The district approved the remodeling of the north wing in 1932, and in 1935, the center unit of Washington High School was completed, with Central School razed in 1935 to make room for the west wing's construction. Following this remodeling, the exterior of Washington High School stood from 1935 until the current Washington High School was completed in 1992. After that, the original school was remodeled to become the Washington Pavilion of Arts and Science.

All Sioux Falls public high school students attended Washington High from 1908 through the 1963–1964 school year. Washington's enrollment grew to 2,925 during the 1963–1964 year. The building's recommended capacity was 2,100. To solve overcrowding, the district began construction on Lincoln High School, as a second high school located on Cliff Avenue next to Interstate 229. For about six weeks, in the fall of 1965, 3,300 students attended classes in a split schedule. Following some delays, Lincoln High School opened on October 19, 1965, with 1,300 students.

In 1986 the building was listed on the National Register of Historic Places as "Washington High School". Now the Washington Pavilion of Arts and Science, it remains listed on the National Register.

== Academics ==
In the 2007–2008 school year, Washington, along with other district schools, achieved a mean composite of 22.6 on the ACT, 1.5 points higher than the national average of 21.1. With 16 Advanced Placement courses offered at Washington, 38.2% of the student body enrolled in at least one, with each participant taking an average of 2.8 classes. The school also offers accelerated courses for students to participate in, with disciplines such as mathematics and English available.

The 2009 graduating class met adequate yearly progress status on the 2008 Dakota STEP examination, a statewide standardized test complying with NCLB requirements, indicating that all student demographics achieved a minimum level of proficiency, marking improvement from previous years and the only class in the district to do so. Almost 44.3% of students from the same class also scored 4.0 (above average) or higher on the district-issued writing assessment.

== Athletics ==
The Warriors were founding members of the Eastern South Dakota Conference before being forced to move to the Sioux Interstate Conference (which included schools in Sioux City, Iowa) due to non traditional girls sports seasons. They have been members of the newly formed Metro Athletic Conference since the 2013-14 season.

Washington High School has 40 state championships in 11-man football, which is currently the most for any high school in the United States. The school also has a record of 717–303–37 from 1899–2010. The Washington Warriors Varsity Football team plays many of its games at Howard Wood Field. Washington went undefeated for six seasons in 11-man football: 2009, 2010, 2011, 2012, 2016, and 2017. They achieved a 34 game win streak between the seasons of 2015-2018, they made the state title game in all four of those years winning it 3 times (15,16,17). Washington also won 14 consecutive championships between 1952 and 1965, the most consecutive state championships in the nation.

== School leadership ==
- Kari Papke, Principal
- Preston Kooima, Asst. Principal
- Nate Malchow, Activities Principal
- Heidi Jorgenson Asst. Principal

== Bus service ==
The school is serviced by Sioux Area Metro route 23 during the school year.

== Notable alumni ==
- Jerry Crider, former MLB player (Minnesota Twins, Chicago White Sox)
- Dan Dworsky, former NFL player
- Matt Farniok, NFL player
- Tom Farniok, former NFL player
- Joe Foss, leading fighter ace of the United States Marine Corps during World War II, 1943 recipient of the Medal of Honor, and 20th Governor of South Dakota
- Barry French, former NFL player
- Nathan Gerry, NFL linebacker for the Philadelphia Eagles
- JaRon Harris, former Green Bay Packers player
- Charles McCaffree, Michigan State University swim coach and Athletic Director from 1941-1974, and President of American Swimming Coaches Association of America
- John Y. McCollister, member of the United States House of Representatives from Nebraska
- George S. Mickelson, 28th Governor of South Dakota
- Christine Olson, businesswoman and state legislator
- David Soul, actor and singer

== Notable staff ==
- Robert E. Caselli, principal (1958-1960, 1974-1988) and member of the South Dakota House of Representatives from 1991 to 1994
