= Farniok =

Farniok is a surname. Notable people with the surname include:

- Matt Farniok (born 1997), American football player
- Tom Farniok (born 1991), American football player
