= Forest Park School District =

Forest Park School District may refer to:

- Forest Park School District (Michigan), in Iron County, Michigan
- Forest Park School District 91, in Illinois
