= James Pollock =

James Pollock may refer to:

- James Pollock (American politician) (1810–1890), governor of the State of Pennsylvania, 1855–1858
- James Pollock (artist) (born 1943), American artist
- James Pollock (Northern Ireland politician) (1893–1982), unionist politician in Northern Ireland
- James Arthur Pollock (1865–1922), Irish-born physicist, active in Australia
- James Dalgleish Pollock (1890–1958), Scottish recipient of the Victoria Cross
- James K. Pollock (1898–1968), American political scientist
- Jim Pollock (born 1930), Canadian politician
- Jim Pollock (rugby union), Scottish rugby union player
