= Christine Olson =

American politician

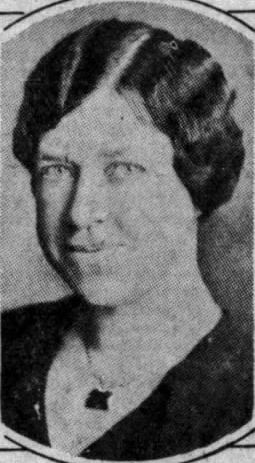
- Olson, circa 1930

Member of the South Dakota House of Representatives from the 10th district
- In office 1924–1926

Personal details
- Born: October 24, 1892 Sioux Falls, South Dakota
- Died: November 11, 1978 (aged 86) Sioux Falls, South Dakota
- Party: Republican

Christine Olson (October 24, 1892 – November 10, 1978) was an American politician and businesswoman. She served one term in the South Dakota House of Representatives as a Republican.

== Early life and education ==
Olson was born on October 24, 1892 in Sioux Falls, South Dakota. She attended Washington High School, from which she graduated in 1910.

== Career ==
Following her high school graduation, Olson worked for the local Larson Hardware Company for four years, then began working as a credit manager for the Sioux Falls Paint and Glass Company in 1914.

In 1924, Olson won election to the South Dakota House of Representatives as one of 7 members from the 10th district. She served one term there, telling the Argus-Leader in December 1925 that she did not intend to run for re-election.

In 1926, the American Woman's Association granted honorary membership to one woman from each state. Olson was chosen for South Dakota as an "outstanding business and professional woman". A meeting was held on March 18 in Madison Square Garden to honor the new members, including Olson.

On April 23, 1929, Olson was elected president of the Sioux Falls Credit Association (then known as the Sioux Falls Association of Credit Men).

On November 6, 1931, the American Legion Auxiliary announced that Olson had been chosen as the chairperson for the group's northwestern division, which oversaw the states of Colorado, Minnesota, Montana, Nebraska, North Dakota, South Dakota, and Wyoming. She had previously served as a department secretary within the organization, serving a one-year term which ended in 1923.

Prior to her retirement, she had worked for the South Dakota State Department of Public Welfare.

== Death ==
Olson died on November 10, 1978, at the age of 86.
