= James Pollock (artist) =

American painter

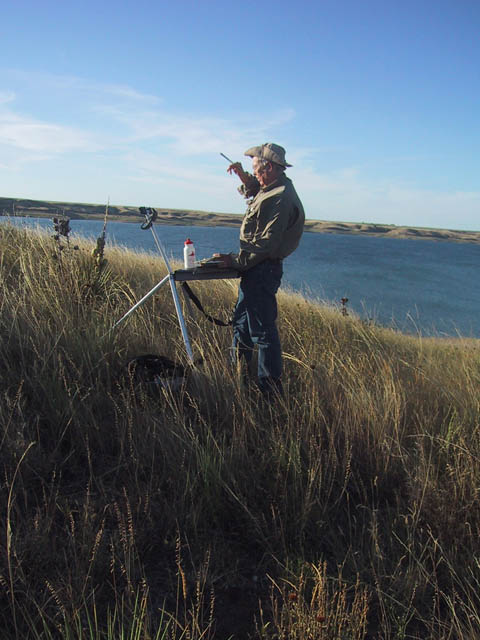
- Artist James Pollock watercolor painting on location along the breaks of Lake Oahe in South Dakota.
- Born: James Pollock; 1943 (age 82–83); Pollock, South Dakota
- Known for: Painter
- Notable work: Looking Down the Trail, 1967, National Museum of the U.S. Army, Set of 5 Centennial Posters, 1983, South Dakota State Historical Society Dakota Survival, 1979, pen and ink drawing of three bison in a snowstorm
- Movement: Plein air
- Awards: Artist of the Year, South Dakota Hall of Fame, 1980

James Pollock (born 1943, South Dakota) is an American artist living in Pierre, South Dakota. Pollock has been characterized as a painter whose work is a bridge between the abstract and the concrete. His style varies widely, sometimes drawing on the abstract styles reminiscent of artists of the early 20th-century Bauhaus school, characterized by strong lines and bold colors, sometimes resembling ancient cave paintings, and sometimes straightforward renderings of landscapes and objects." Pollock is an active plein air painter and member of the South Dakota Plein Air Artists movement.

== Early years and education ==
Pollock grew up in Pollock, a small town in north-central South Dakota, and was named after his great-grandfather Robert Y. Pollock. Pollock had an early interest in art which was encouraged by an aunt. In 1965 he graduated with a major in art from South Dakota State University, Brookings, South Dakota.

== US Army Vietnam Combat Artists Program ==
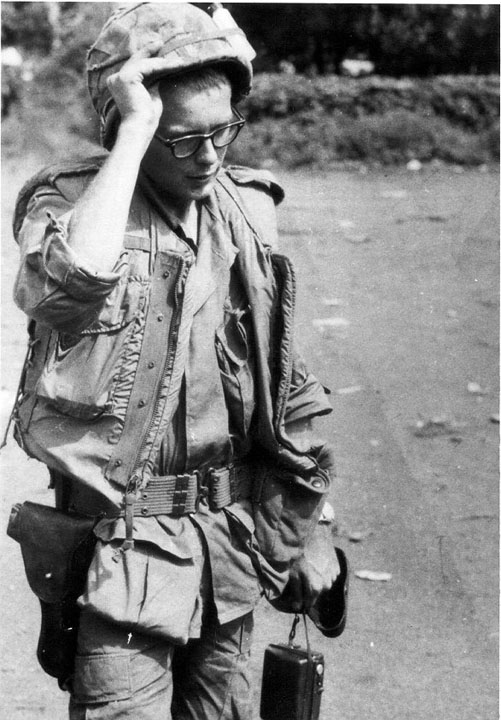
Artist James Pollock serving with the Vietnam Combat Artists Program CAT Team IV in Vietnam in 1967

In 1966 James Pollock was drafted into the US Army. In 1967 while working as a postal clerk at Camp Ames army base in South Korea Pollock applied for assignment to the U. S. Army Vietnam Combat Artists Program. He was accepted into the program and from 15, August 1967 through December 31, 1967, he served on U. S Army Vietnam Combat Artist Team IV (CAT IV). Art completed by Pollock during his assignment as a Vietnam soldier-artist is in the permanent U.S. Army Art Collection, maintained by the U.S. Army Center of Military History (CMH), Washington, D.C. Pollock's art has been included in traveling exhibits organized by the U.S Army Center of Military History. The collection of the Emil A. Blackmore Museum in Indianapolis, Indiana also includes a piece of Pollock's art from the Vietnam Era.

From October 27, 2000, through January 7, 2001, Pollock's work produced while a member of the Vietnam Combat Artists Program was exhibited in THE ART OF COMBAT: Artists and the Vietnam War, Then and Now, mounted by the Indianapolis Art Center in Indiana.

In 2003 James Pollock presented a lecture about the U. S. Army Vietnam Combat Artists Program at the Library of Congress in Washington, D.C. sponsored by the Library of Congress Professional Association (LCPA) Veterans Forum in the Mary Pickford Theater. This was the first public presentation where the historical collection of Vietnam War art was presented in the context of individual artists and their particular teams and time frames.

In 2010 the National Constitution Center in partnership with the U.S. Army Center of Military History and the National Museum of the United States Army presented a major exhibit entitled Art of the American Soldier that included pieces done by Pollock during his service in the Vietnam Combat Artists Program.

== Post-military art career ==
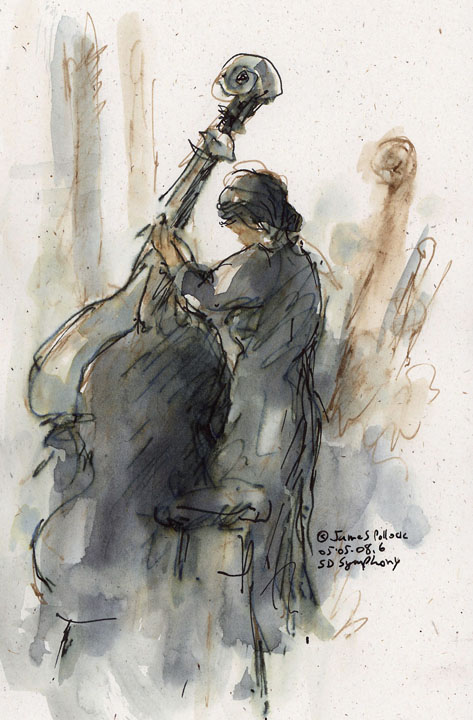
This 2005 watercolor and ink wash entitled "Concert Strings" was painted by James Pollock on stage as part of a unique collaboration event between the South Dakota Symphony Orchestra and seven South Dakota Plein air Artists. Copyright 2005 James Pollock.

After discharge from the army, Pollock worked as staff artist for Dakota North Plains Corporation, (publishers of the DAKOTA FARMER magazine) in Aberdeen, South Dakota. In 1973 Pollock went to work as a graphic artist and illustrator for the State of South Dakota making design and illustrative contributions to state publications including the SOUTH DAKOTA CONSERVATION DIGEST.

In 1976 Pollock produced a set of 10 limited edition silkscreen prints depicting the terrain and wildlife of South Dakota that were exhibited for sale at Mount Rushmore. DAKOTA SURVIVAL, a print of a pen and ink drawing of three bison in a prairie blizzard proved the most popular.

In the mid 1970s eight South Dakota artists, including Pollock, banded together and formed the South Dakota Western Artists Association (SDWAA).

James Pollock was named Artist of the Year by the South Dakota Cowboy and Western Heritage Hall of Fame (now known as South Dakota Hall of Fame) in 1980, the first year the award was given.

In 1983 Pollock was commissioned to produce a series of posters for the South Dakota Centennial Project.

In 1985 Pollock began experimenting and creating art with a computer.

In 1987. Pollock was chosen to design the first issue gold and silver bullion pieces for the State of South Dakota. The design of two bison standing on the prairie (referred to as the double bison) appears on one side, the official South Dakota State Seal appears on the other side. Pollock was appointed to the South Dakota Arts Council in 1988 by then Governor George S. Mickelson. In 1992 James Pollock and two other South Dakota artists, (Mick Harrison and Norm Feugen) traveled to Calgary, Alberta, Canada and exhibited their art in the USA Pavilion at EQUI-FAIR 92.

In 1999 Yugoslav artist Zlatko Vasic organized an exhibition titled The Last Waltz at the Greek Cultural Center in Stockholm, Sweden to raise money to restore the Museum of Modern Art in Belgrade. The exhibit featured original art by 11 artists from four countries including the United States, Sweden, Italy and Yugoslavia. James Pollock was one of 4 Americans invited to participate.

James Pollock was one of seven South Dakota Plein Aire Artists (SDPAA) invited by the South Dakota Symphony Orchestra to sketch, paint and interpret music live on stage during the performance of Pictures at an Exhibition at a 2005 concert in the Washington Pavilion in Sioux Falls, South Dakota. This mixing of live symphonic music and artists painting live on stage in front of a public audience was the first of its kind in South Dakota.

In 2009, Pollock chronicled his experience in the Vietnam Combat Artists Program in an essay entitled "US Army Soldier-Artists in Vietnam" for "War, Literature & the Arts: An International Journal of the Humanities" published by the department of English and Fine Arts, United States Air Force Academy.

In June 2015, South Dakota Public Broadcasting interviewed combat artist James Pollock about his experiences in the Vietnam Combat Art Program.

In September 2017, South Dakota Public Broadcasting produced a video about the Vietnam Combat Artists Program entitled "The Art of War" as part of their SD Vietnam Stories project produced to accompany the broadcast of Ken Burns' "The Vietnam War" series. James Pollock was interviewed about his participation in the program.

Pollock is a founding member of Artists of the Black Hills (ABH), an association of professional artists and other interested parties that organized in 2005.

In August 2018, Pollock was named the Harvey Dunn Award winner at a Plein Air painting competition in DeSmet, South Dakota. Eighty-three artists from six states competed for the honor. Harvey Dunn, born on a homestead farm near DeSmet, was a successful illustrator, teacher, and was selected by the American Expeditionary Forces as an official artist during WWI. The Harvey Dunn Society acknowledges his legacy through this annual award.

In October 2018, Pollock, in collaboration with poet Steve Boint, published a book of art and poetry entitled "Sketchbook 91-1-1."

=== Gallery ===
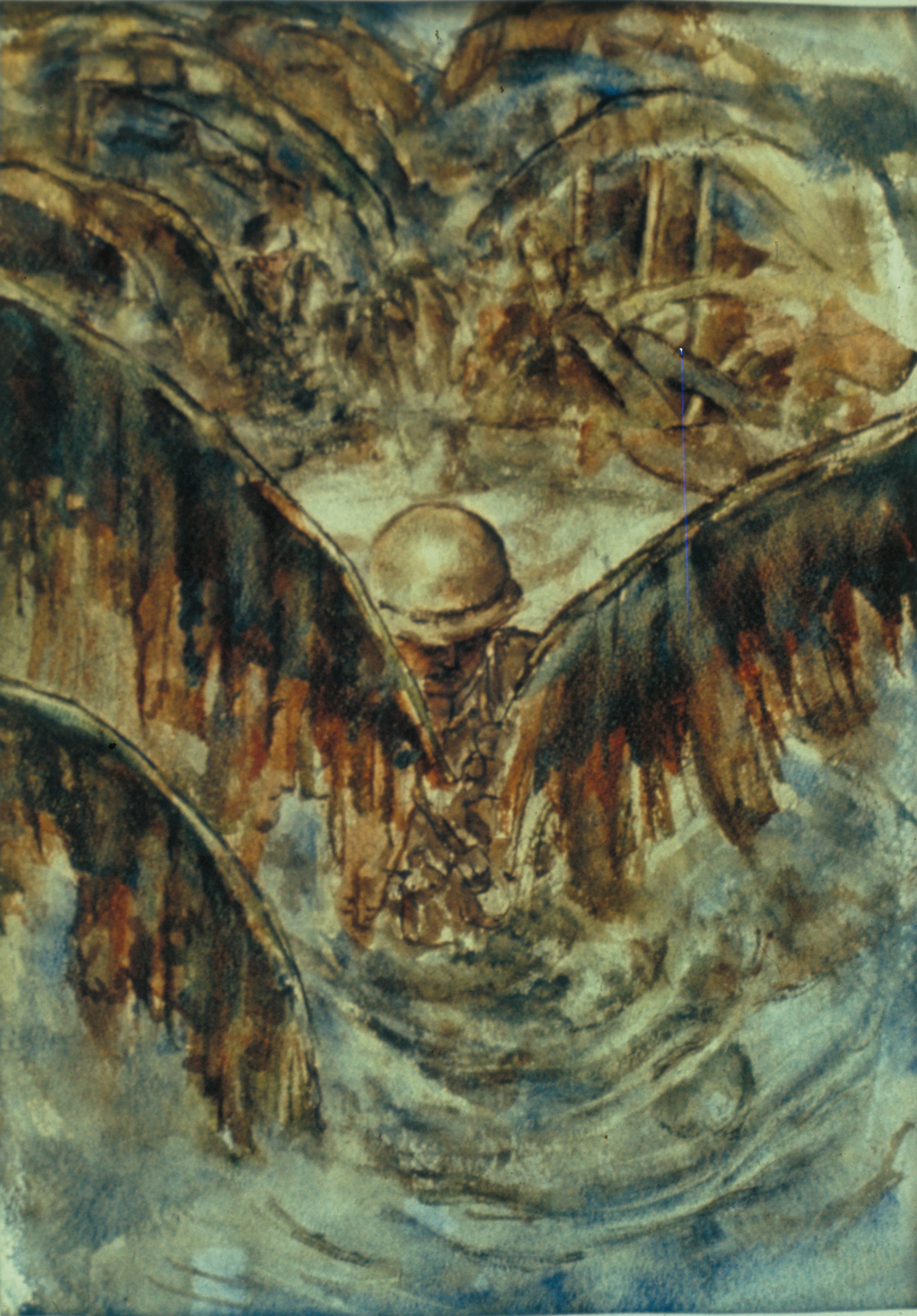
LOOKING DOWN THE TRAIL, Watercolor, by James Pollock, CAT IV, 1967

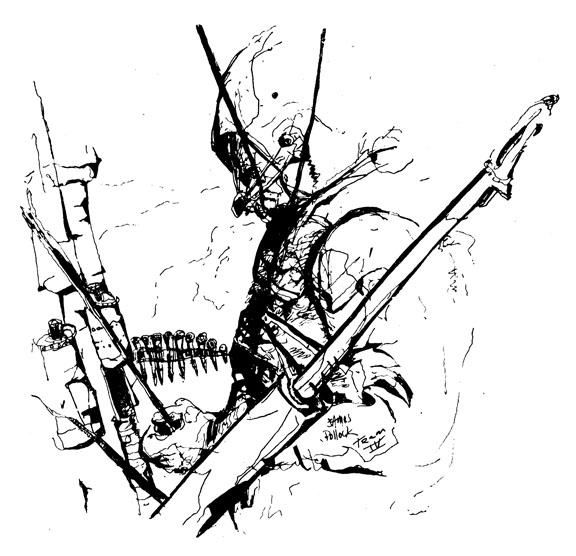
DOOR GUNNER, Pen and Ink, by James Pollock, CAT IV, 1967

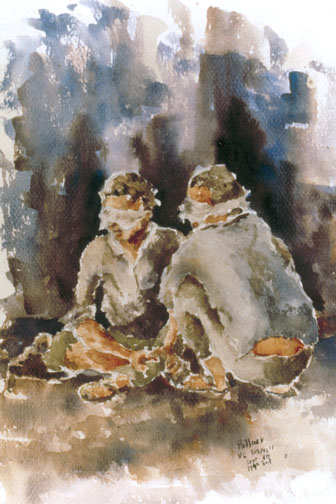
WAITING INTERROGATION,199th LT INF BG, Watercolor, by James Pollock, CAT IV, 1967

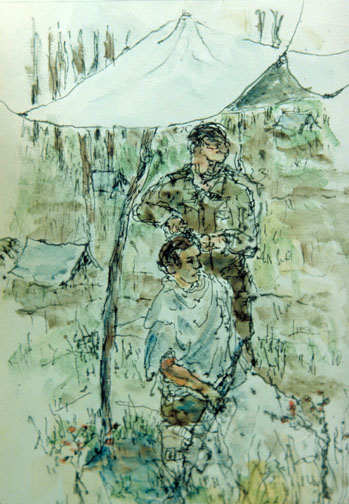
FIELD HAIRCUT AT BIG RED ONE, Ink/Watercolor wash, by James Pollock, CAT IV, 1967

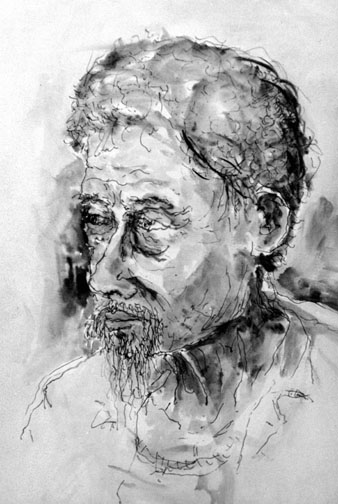
OLD VIETNAMESE MAN, Ink Wash, by James Pollock, CAT IV, 1967

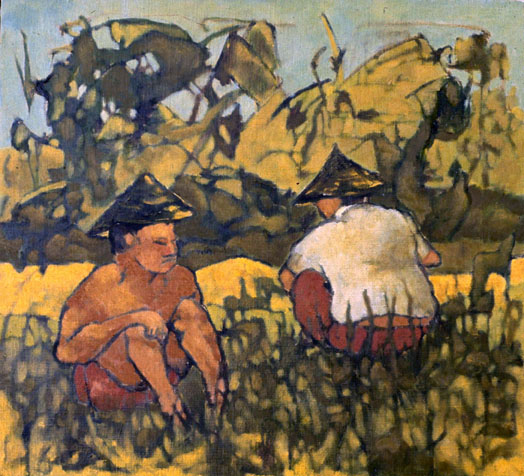
LOCALS, Oil, by James Pollock, CAT IV, 1967

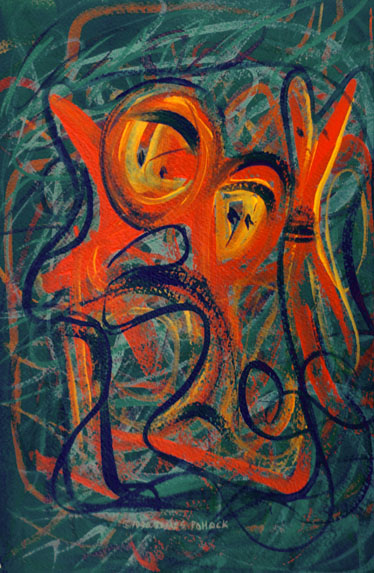
CAMPFIRE LYRICS, Acrylic on Arches, exhibited at "The Last Waltz", Greek Cultural Center, Stockholm, Sweden, 1999. Copyright 1990 James Pollock.

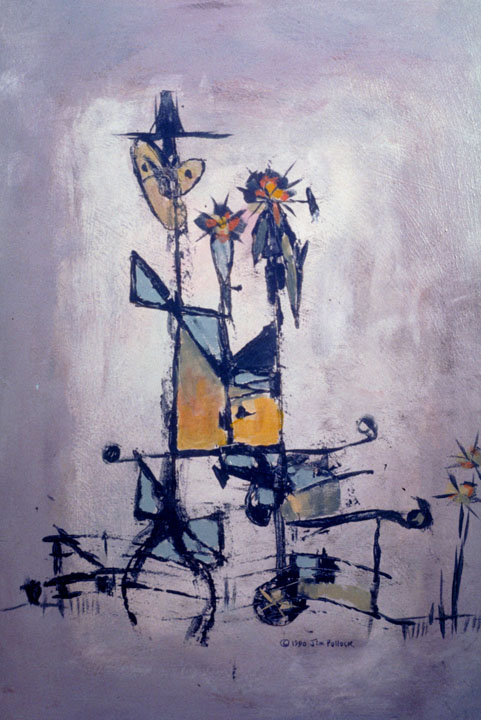
THE FLOWER VENDOR, Acrylic. Copyright 1990 James Pollock.

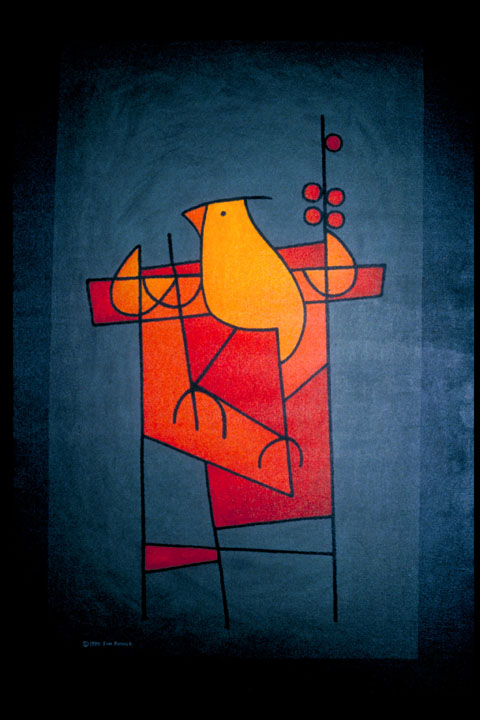
BIRD IN A FLOWER PATCH, Acrylic. Copyright 1990 James Pollock.

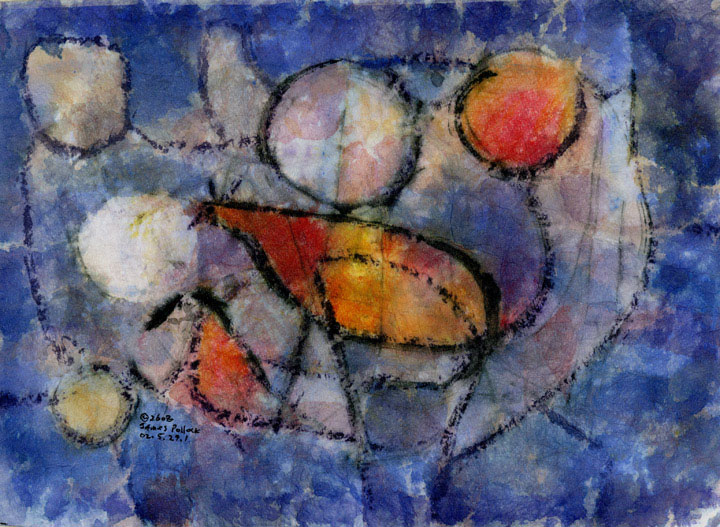
ANIMAL CLOWN, Abstract Watercolor. Copyright 2002 James Pollock.

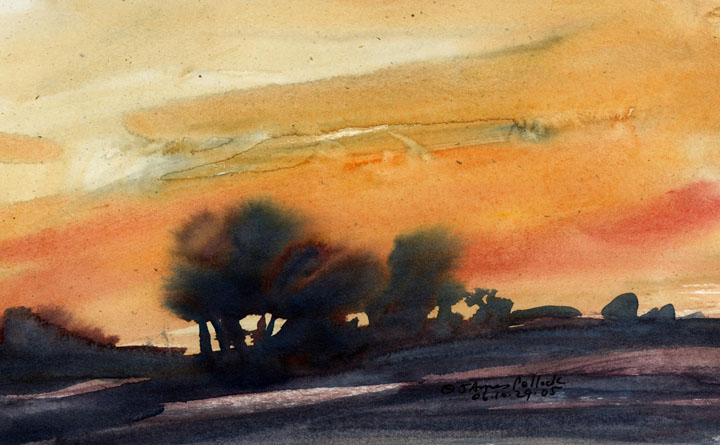
DAKOTA SUNSET, Plein air work completed on location as the sun was setting on the prairies of South Dakota. Copyright 2006 James Pollock.

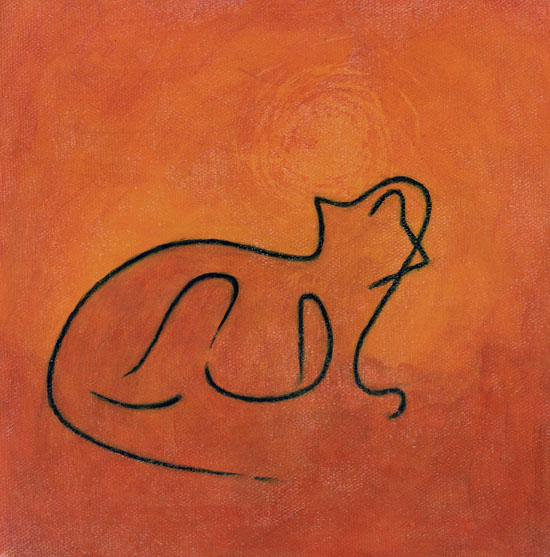
PUFFY II, Acrylic, Copyright 2009 James Pollock.
