= Robert E. Caselli =

American politician (born 1927)

Member of the South Dakota House of Representatives
- In office 1991–1994

Personal details
- Born: December 3, 1927 (age 98) Indiana, U.S.
- Party: Democratic
- Education: Dakota State University; University of South Dakota; University of Chicago

Robert Eugene Caselli (born December 3, 1927) is an American politician and teacher from South Dakota. He served as a Democratic member of the South Dakota House of Representatives for South Dakota's 12th legislative district.

== Life and career ==
Caselli was born in Indiana on December 3, 1927, to Italian immigrants. He attended Proviso Township High School in Maywood, Illinois. He graduated from Dakota State University in 1951 and received a master's degree from the University of South Dakota in 1960. He then completed postgraduate studies at South Dakota State University and the University of Chicago.

He was principal of Washington High School in Sioux Falls, South Dakota from 1958 to 1960 and from 1974 to 1988.

Caselli served in the South Dakota House of Representatives from 1991 to 1994.
