= Proviso East High School =

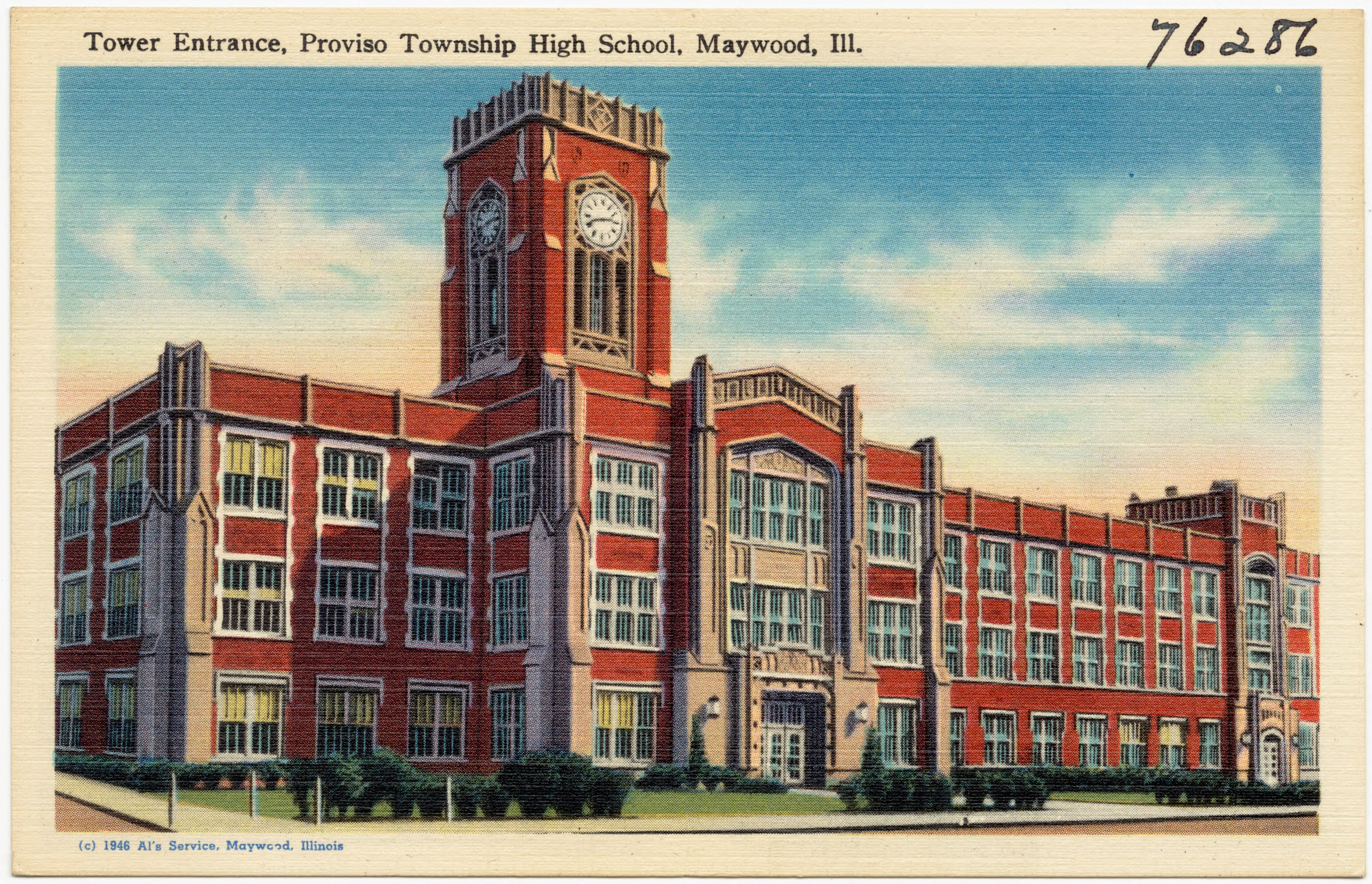
- Postcard of tower entrance, early 20th century

Location
- 807 South First Avenue; Maywood, Illinois 60153; United States; 41°52′51″N 87°49′56″W

Information
- School type: Public Secondary
- Opened: 1911
- School district: Proviso Twp. HS Dist. 209
- Superintendent: Mr. Krish Mohip
- Principal: Rodney Hull
- Faculty: 106.50 (FTE)
- Grades: 9–12
- Gender: Co-ed
- Enrollment: 1,663 (2024–2025)
- Average class size: 22.6
- Student to teacher ratio: 15.62
- Campus: Suburban
- Colors: Royal Blue; White
- Athletics conference: West Suburban Conference
- Nickname: Pirates
- Newspaper: Pageant
- Yearbook: Provi
- Website: east.pths209.org

Proviso East High School is a public secondary school in Maywood, Illinois, which serves the educational needs of Maywood and three other villages within Proviso Township, Cook County, Illinois: Broadview, Forest Park and Melrose Park. It is the original campus of Proviso Township High Schools District 209. Prior to being split into East and Proviso West High School in 1958, East was known as Proviso Township High School. The school is located at the intersection of Madison Street and First Avenue (which is Illinois Route 171 in that part of Maywood).

Proviso East's history in many ways reflects that of some suburban and urban schools in the United States. While initially serving mostly a Caucasian population, as demographic shifts occurred in the post-World War II years, a larger African-American population moved in, triggering violence from racialist gangs.

Despite the tensions that occurred in the second half of the twentieth century, the school is known for its extensive list of notable alumni. While perhaps best known for its connection to notable NBA players (Jim Brewer, Michael Finley, and Glenn "Doc" Rivers among the more prominent) and other athletes such as Ray Nitschke, the school has seen other alumni achieve well in other areas, such as Civil Rights Activist and Chairman of the Illinois Black Panther Party Fred Hampton, businesswoman Sheila Johnson, actor Dennis Franz, musician John Prine, and astronaut Gene Cernan, the last man to walk on the Moon.

== History ==
=== 1911 – World War I ===
The cornerstone of the school was laid on January 21, 1911 in a ceremony presided over by a local lodge of the Ancient Free and Accepted Masons (part of the newspaper story reported the group to be the Knights Templar). The 22 member class of 1911 graduated from the building, even though the school would not be completed until July.

From even its early days, students were no stranger to protest. In May 1913, in retaliation for what students claimed were "harsh methods", an effigy of the principal, J.E. Witmer, was hung from the telegraph wires in front of the school. After the principal removed the effigy in the early evening, another was hung from the flagpole on top of the school. When signs were found painted on the sidewalk in front of the school the next day, the local marshal took every male in the senior class into custody, ordering them to remove the signs under threat of arrest. The next year, 110 students walked out on strike when the principal refused to grant a holiday for Columbus Day.

In October 1915, the school district began the process of selling US$50,000 in bonds for the purpose of expanding the school.

In 1929, work began on a new school building. A bond issue was approved by voters in June, though a lawsuit filed by some local taxpayers led to an injunction blocking the bond issue after construction had begun. The new school construction was eventually completed.

In November 1936, voters in the district approved a bond issue, in conjunction with funding from the Public Works Administration, for the construction of a fieldhouse. The fieldhouse, including a swimming pool, was completed in 1938.

=== World War II – 1950s ===
The outbreak of World War II brought almost immediately bad news to the school. Several of their alumni had been a part of an Illinois National Guard unit (Baker Company, 192nd Tank Battalion). The unit had been activated by the U.S. Army in 1940, and was caught in heavy fighting in the Philippines. Of the 137 members of the company that were killed or captured while defending the islands against the Japanese invasion, 52 of them were alumni. Those not killed were forced to participate in the Bataan Death March. Starting in September 1942, and for every September since, the loss to the community has been commemorated. In the end, 191 alumni were killed in the war.

There were several changes to the school as a result of the war. A pre-flight aeronautics class that was open to both young men and women. Ostensibly, the course was designed to reduce training time for future military pilots. Despite being a suburban school, coursework was offered to students who were interested in filling needed jobs in the agriculture sector. The National Youth Administration (NYA) built a workshop on the property to advance vocational education. When the NYA ceased operation in 1943, the school negotiated for the workshop to be turned over to the school, greatly increasing its work space for vocational education. During the summer months, Proviso became a center for training industrial workers necessary for the war effort, offering classes in three shifts, 24 hours a day.

In April 1951, the Illinois Education Association meeting held at Proviso East saw a keynote address by Edith S. Sampson, the United States' alternate delegate to the United Nations, and the first African-American woman to represent the U.S. at the United Nations.

In 1953, researchers from the University of Chicago recommended that the school begin planning to expand, and school district officials began examining the purchase of land for a new school. By 1955, the school population had grown to over 3,400 students, with an estimated increase to over 6,500 students by 1956. In June 1955, the board accepted a recommendation to purchase a 60 acre site in the town of Hillside, and planned a bond issue for the autumn. Even with the plans for a new school moving forward, the district also approved an expansion of Proviso: a new gymnasium for young women, new music rooms, and new facilities for woodworking classes. In November, the bond issue was approved by a 5900–626 vote. 1957, the last year Proviso would be the only school in the district, the student population topped out at over 4,800 students. With the new school determined to be Proviso West, the board of education voted to officially change the school's name to Proviso East, effective July 1, 1958.

=== 1960s ===
In 1963, with a combined student population of over 7,000 between the two schools, further room was needed. East added a total of nine new classrooms by (literally) carving them from a hallway, and the passageway which connected the new and old additions of the school. Proviso East was caught up in a great deal of the racial turmoil that was prevalent in the country in the late 1960s. The 1967–68 school year saw local tensions become violent.

In September 1967, a large fight, started in the school cafeteria when five caucasian girls were selected by school officials as finalists for the school's Homecoming Queen, escalated as students were dismissed. Property damage, some caused by the use of gasoline bombs, and fighting caused more than 100 state troopers to be called in, and a strict curfew to be enforced. Principal Hubert Pitt announced that he would appoint a racially balanced group of students to select a new slate of candidates.

Three days later, the situation had not improved, and officials were forced to ask parents to come in and patrol the halls in an attempt to quell the violence. Another fight broke out in the cafeteria. One of the suspected perpetrators was later found out not to be a student at the school leading some to suspect the fight was planned. 31 students were arrested after they later attempted to run from the school. Later, nineteen students were arrested on the street for carrying tire irons. This all came 24 hours after approximately one-half of the school refused to attend classes.

The local chapter of the NAACP by this time had urged a boycott of the schools, and drew up a list of 28 demands for school officials. Some students, both African-American and Caucasian, defied the boycott, but only about one-third of students showed up for classes. The boycott was lifted on October 1, after officials of the school district and the local NAACP reached a compromise.

Later that month, another series of fights at the school required the help of state and county police in addition to police from the City of Chicago and surrounding suburbs. The fights stemmed from the suspension of an African-American student who was fighting with a Caucasian student. The next day, over 300 police officers were called in to handle new disturbances that caused classes to be cancelled. Several students in the street were arrested for criminal damage and theft. Teachers threatened to strike if discipline was not restored. Later that day, an arson threat was called in against the school, forcing police to ring the school, and begin keeping outsiders away from the area. The superintendent threatened to assign uniformed officers to each classroom, if necessary. Two days later, classes resumed with 55 off duty police officers inside the school, and expulsion notices were sent out to students seen as "persistent trouble makers". This led to the expulsion of 35 students.

There was another incident in March involving 300 students. The following day, school officials closed Proviso East for two days. While the school was closed, school officials met to review discipline procedures and plan enforcement, which they said would include the use of chemical mace to quell disturbances. The 300 students involved in the most recent fighting were permitted to return, provided they signed a nonviolence pledge, a move that was challenged by the NAACP. The school board then voted to defer the requirement or students to sign the pledges.

The 1968–69 school year saw more racial problems. In mid-September, after a day that saw 15 students hurt during fights in the school, a group of 200 students began throwing rocks and other projectiles at passing cars. Seven were arrested. The incidents resulted in six expulsions and three more students withdrawing.

=== 1970s and 1980s ===
While the 1970s did see a calmer start than the 1960s ended for Proviso East, there were new issues that had to be faced.

Despite the school's large population (still about 4,000), the school was forced to adopt austerity measures, which in 1973 involved laying off 52 of the districts' 422 teachers. About 150 students responded by walking out of school, each of which resulted in a suspension.

As the 1980s arrived, Proviso East became a school with a population that was now predominantly African-American. This was not the case with its sister school. In 1976, the Illinois State Board of Education had passed rules that required the percentage of minority students within a school be within 15% of the district's minority enrollment. The school district had redrawn the attendance boundaries for the district to comply, however did not successfully desegregate when local housing patterns did not change as anticipated. In 1982, the Illinois Supreme Court invalidated the State Boards orders, claiming they had overstepped their authority in demanding desegregation.

=== 1990s ===
In 1996 Casey Banas of the Chicago Tribune stated that the school had a poor reputation. In the six county Chicago metropolitan area, as of 1996, Proviso East ranked no. 128 in a ranking of 132 suburban high schools on the American College Test (ACT). That year, Joseph Scoliere, the superintendent of the Forest Park School District 91, stated that of the 91 students graduating from the 8th grade in June 1996, 25 enrolled at Proviso East.

== Academics ==
Proviso East's class of 2009 had an average composite ACT score of 15.6. 88.3% of the senior class graduated. Proviso East did not make Adequate Yearly Progress (AYP) on the Prairie State Achievement Examination, which with the ACT comprises the state assessments used to fulfill the federal No Child Left Behind Act. Neither the school overall, nor any of its four student subgroups met expectations in reading or mathematics. As of 2009, the school is listed as being in its sixth year of academic watch.

== Athletics ==
Proviso East competes in the West Suburban Conference. The school is also a member of the Illinois High School Association (IHSA), which governs most sports and non-athletic competition in the state. Teams are stylized as the Pirates. Prior to the 1975–76 school year, Proviso East had been an original member of the Suburban League. With the League's end, Proviso East joined the West Suburban Conference, and has remained there ever since.

The school sponsors interscholastic athletic teams for young men and women in: basketball, bowling, cross country, golf, soccer, tennis, track & field, and volleyball. Young men may also compete in baseball, football, and wrestling, while young women may compete in softball.

The following teams have finished in the top four of their respective IHSA state championship tournament or meet:

- Baseball: State Champions (1943–44, 1952–53, 1956–57, 1976–77)
- Basketball (boys): 4th place (2012–13); 2nd place (1980–81, 2011–12); State Champions (1968–69, 1973–74, 1990–91, 1991–92)
- Cross Country (boys): 4th place (1956–57); State Champions (1954–55, 1957–58)
- Gymnastics (boys): 3rd place (1956–57, 1958–59); 2nd place (1959–60, 1960–61, 1964–65); State Champions (1957–58, 1961–62, 1965–66)
- Swimming & Diving (boys): 3rd place (1947–48, 1948–49)
- Track & Field (boys): 4th place (1974–75, 1983–84, 1988–89); 3rd place (1962–63, 1975–76); 2nd place (1932–33); State Champions (1939–40, 1979–80)
- Wrestling: 4th place (1988–89); 3rd place (1940–41, 1945–46, 1951–52, 1963–64, 1968–69, 1989–90); 2nd place (1955–56, 1962–63, 1979–80, 1980–81); State Champions (1936–37, 1937–38, 1938–39, 1939–40, 1941–42, 1942–43, 1944–45, 1956–57, 1985–86, 1990–91)

The wrestling program, as of the end of the 2008–09, is tied for the most state championships and most top four finishes in state history. The program holds the state record for most top 10 finishes.

The baseball team's four state titles tie it with two other schools for the state record.

On October 3, 1934, the school's new stadium was dedicated. While four teams from the school did play, the highlight of the dedication was an exhibition between the Maywood Athletic club football team and the NFL Chicago Cardinals.

In March 1941, the fieldhouse at Proviso East hosted a tennis exhibition featuring the Alice Marble Troupe of Professional Tennis Stars. Among the tennis players in attendance to compete were Donald Budge and Bill Tilden.

The school was the site for the men's and women's volleyball matches at the 1959 Pan American Games.

In December 2020, the District 209 school board approved a $106,400 bid from Chicago-based National Wrecking to demolish the school’s aging football stadium.

In October 2021, Proviso East dedicated a new football stadium, Theresa L. Kelly Stadium, named after the long serving board member of District 209, Theresa L. Kelly.

== Notable alumni ==
=== Activism and public service ===
- Robert Caselli, former Democratic member of the South Dakota House of Representatives
- Fred Hampton (class of 1966) was an activist and member of the Black Panther Party
- Jacques Paul Klein (class of 1957) is a former UN Under-Secretary-General, Ambassador, Major General of USAF
- Kimberly Lightford (class of 1986) is a majority leader of the Illinois Senate
- Franklin Rosemont (class of 1961, dropped out in 1960) was one of the foremost surrealists in the United States. He was the publisher of radical labor history, surrealism, and blues

=== Arts and entertainment ===
- Mike Douglas was a singer and television personality best known for hosting the syndicated The Mike Douglas Show in the 1970s
- Dennis Franz (class of 1962) is a multi-Emmy Award winning actor, best known for his roles in television series such as Hill Street Blues and NYPD Blue
- Dennis Grimaldi (class of 1965) is a Tony Award and Pulitzer Prize-winning Broadway and television producer, former Actor and dancer. His production of the play Girl's Room starred alumna Carol Lawrence
- Eddie Hoh (class of 1963), was a notable studio and touring drummer, playing and recording with The Downbeats, The Monkees, The Mamas & Papas, Lee Michaels, Mike Bloomfield, Stephen Stills, Donovan, Tim Buckley and The Modern Folk Quartet
- Mark Lamos (class of 1964), theater and opera director, producer, and actor
- Carol Lawrence (class of 1950) is a singer and actress, best known for her work on stage and on television. In 1957, she originated the role of Maria as part of the original cast of West Side Story
- Lucki, rapper
- John Prine (class of 1964, January 1965 graduation) was a Grammy Award winning folk/country singer/songwriter

=== Science and letters ===
- Gene Cernan (class of 1952) was a NASA astronaut. He was the co-pilot of Gemini 9A, the lunar module pilot of Apollo 10, and commander of Apollo 17, where he was the last man to walk on the Moon. He is one of three people to have flown to the Moon twice
- Martin C. Jischke (class of 1959) is a physicist, educator, and former president of Purdue University (2000–07)
- William Chester Jordan is the Chairman of the History Department at Princeton University, and is a leading scholar in Medievalism
- Walter B. LaBerge (class of 1941) was a World War II vet, physicist, co-inventor Sidewinder missile, in charge of building Mission Control Center (NASA), Under Secretary of Air Force, Army, Defense, and NATO, VP Lockheed, chief scientist IAT, professor Naval Post Graduate School, and flew in SR-71 Blackbird at Mach 3+ at 80,000 FT

=== Business ===
- Sheila Johnson (class of 1966) is a philanthropist and co-founder of BET. She is also president of the Washington Mystics

=== Sports ===
- Donnie Boyce (class of 1991) was an NBA guard (1995–97), playing his entire career with the Atlanta Hawks
- Jim Brewer (class of 1969) was an NBA forward (1973–82). He was a first round draft pick in the 1973 NBA draft by the Cleveland Cavaliers, for which he played most of his career. He was a member of the 1982 NBA Champion Los Angeles Lakers and the 1972 U.S. Men's Olympic Basketball Team
- Dee Brown (class of 2002) was a professional basketball player who has played in both the NBA and in Europe; he led Illinois to a 37–2 record and the 2005 NCAA Men's Division I Basketball Championship game
- Sergio Brown (class of 2006) was an NFL player (2010–2016)
- Shannon Brown (class of 2003) was an NBA guard (2006—2014). A first-round draft pick in 2006, he was a member of the 2009 and 2010 NBA Champions Los Angeles Lakers
- Sterling Brown (class of 2013) was an NBA player for the Dallas Mavericks
- Ray Buchanan (class of 1989) was an All-Pro defensive back (1993–2004), playing most of his career with the Atlanta Falcons
- Richard Buchanan (class of 1987) was a wide receiver, Frankfurt Galaxy (1992), Los Angeles Rams (1993-1994)
- Brian Carlwell (class of 2006), former basketball player
- Jevon Carter (class of 2014), former basketball player for the West Virginia Mountaineers
- Michael Finley (class of 1991) was an NBA player (1995–2010), who was drafted in the first round of the 1995 NBA draft by the Phoenix Suns. He was a member of the 2007 NBA Champion San Antonio Spurs
- Sherell Ford (class of 1991) was an NBA forward (1995–96). He was a first round draft pick of the Seattle SuperSonics in the 1995 NBA Draft
- Greg Foster was a hurdler. In addition to winning three world championships in the 110-metre hurdles, he won the silver medal in that event at the 1984 Summer Olympics
- Orval Grove was an All-Star pitcher (1940–49), playing his entire career with the Chicago White Sox
- Steven Hunter (class of 1999) was an NBA player (2001—2011) for the Orlando Magic, Philadelphia 76ers, Phoenix Suns and Denver Nuggets
- Shirley Jameson (class of 1935) was a nationally recognized speed skater and softball player in the 1930s and a star in the All-American Girls Professional Baseball League, 1943-1946
- Jim Johnson was a football coach in the collegiate and professional ranks for over 40 years
- Reggie Jordan was an NBA guard (1993–2000), playing most of his career with the Minnesota Timberwolves
- Chuck Kassel was an NFL end (1927–33), playing most of his career for the Chicago Cardinals
- Paris Lee (class of 2013) is a basketball player (Illinois State; Israeli Basketball Premier League)
- Ray Nitschke (class of 1954) was an NFL linebacker (1958–72), playing his entire career with the Green Bay Packers, on three NFL champion teams and two Super Bowl champions. A member of the NFL 1960s All-Decade Team and 75th Anniversary All-Time Team, he was elected to the Pro Football Hall of Fame in 1978
- Bunny Oakes (class of 1916) was a player for the national champion 1923 Illinois Fighting Illini football team. He later was head coach at the University of Montana, Colorado and Wyoming
- Ed O'Bradovich was an NFL defensive end (1962–71), playing his entire career for the Chicago Bears. He was a member of the 1963 NFL Championship team
- Jacob Pullen (class of 2007), former basketball player for the Kansas State Wildcats
- Glenn "Doc" Rivers (class of 1980) was an All-Star NBA guard (1983–96), playing most of his career with the Atlanta Hawks. As a head coach, he oversaw the Orlando Magic, Philadelphia 76ers, and the Los Angeles Clippers and led the Boston Celtics to the 2008 NBA Championship and was named one of the top 15 coaches of all time
- Jerome Sally was a defensive tackle (1982–88), playing most of his career with the New York Giants. He was a member of their Super Bowl XXI champion team
- Lee Stange was a Major League pitcher (1961–70), and later worked as a pitching coach and minor league manager
- Antonio Williams (class of 2016), basketball player in the ProA
- Joanne Winter, 1940s All-American Girls Professional Baseball League pitcher and 1960s LPGA golfer
- Mike Woodard (class of 1978) was a Major League second baseman (1985–88), playing most of his career with the San Francisco Giants
