= Matt Farniok =

American football player (born 1997)

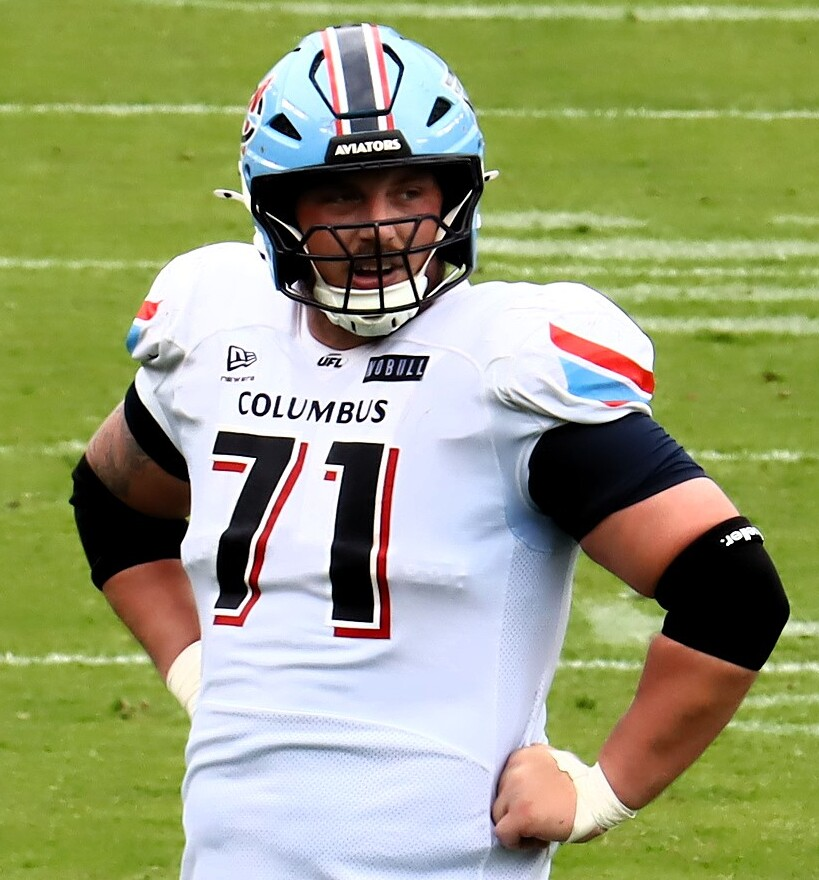
- Farniok with Columbus Aviators in 2026

Profile
- Position: Center

Personal information
- Born: September 26, 1997 (age 29); Sioux Falls, South Dakota, U.S.
- Listed height: 6 ft 5 in (1.96 m)
- Listed weight: 325 lb (147 kg)

Career information
- High school: Washington (Sioux Falls)
- College: Nebraska (2016–2020)
- NFL draft: 2021: 7th round, 238th overall pick

Career history
- Dallas Cowboys (2021–2022); Chicago Bears (2023)*; Detroit Lions (2023)*; Birmingham Stallions (2025)*; Arlington Renegades (2025); Columbus Aviators (2026)
- * Offseason or practice squad member only

Career NFL statistics as of 2025
- Games played: 19
- Games started: 2
- Stats at Pro Football Reference

Matt Farniok (born September 26, 1997) is an American professional football center. He was selected by the Dallas Cowboys in the seventh round of the 2021 NFL draft. He played college football at Nebraska.

== Early life ==
Farniok attended Washington High School. As a sophomore, he became a starter at the offensive line. As a junior, he received Class 11AAA All-state and Sioux Falls Argus Leader's Elite 45 honors.

As a senior in 2015, Matt Farniok contributed to the team winning the state title. He received South Dakota Gatorade Player of the Year, first-team Parade All-American, Class 11AAA All-state and Sioux Falls Argus Leader's Elite 45 honors.

Farniok was ranked as a three–star recruit by 247Sports.com coming out of high school. He committed to Nebraska on January 27, 2016.

== College career ==
As a redshirt freshman, he appeared in 7 games with 4 starts. He had 2 starts at right tackle and 2 starts at right guard.

As a sophomore, he was named the starter at right tackle, contributing to the team averaging 456.2 yards of total offense. As a junior, he started all 12 games at right tackle.

As a senior in 2020, the football season was reduced to 8 games due to the COVID-19 pandemic. He became one of 13 two-time captains in school history, while starting all 8 games on the offensive line. He started 7 contests at right guard and one contest at center.

== Professional career ==
Pre-draft measurables
Height	Weight	Arm length	Hand span	Wingspan	40-yard dash	10-yard split	20-yard split	20-yard shuttle	Three-cone drill	Vertical jump	Broad jump	Bench press
6 ft 5 1/4 in (1.96 m)	311 lb (141 kg)	33 1/4 in (0.84 m)	9 5/8 in (0.24 m)	6 ft 7 3/4 in (2.03 m)	5.20 s	1.78 s	3.07 s	4.47 s	7.19 s	33.0 in (0.84 m)	8 ft 9 in (2.67 m)	28 reps
All values from Pro Day

=== Dallas Cowboys ===
Farniok was selected by the Dallas Cowboys in the seventh round (238th overall) of the 2021 NFL draft. He signed a four-year rookie contract on May 13, 2021. As a rookie, he appeared in 12 games, playing mostly in kick protection on special teams. He was declared inactive for the Wild Card playoff game.

In 2022, he appeared in 7 games, starting two at left guard in place of an injured Connor McGovern. In addition to being a backup guard and center, he also acted as a blocking fullback in certain goal-line plays. His offensive snaps decreased after Jason Peters was promoted to the active roster in Week 3. He suffered a torn hamstring injury while blocking for an extra point attempt in the seventh game of the season, against the Detroit Lions. On October 26, 2022, Farniok was placed on injured reserve.

In the 2023 preseason, he fell on the depth chart behind rookies Asim Richards and T. J. Bass. He was waived on August 29, 2023.

=== Chicago Bears ===
On September 7, 2023, Farniok was signed to the practice squad of the Chicago Bears. He was released on November 17.

=== Detroit Lions ===
On December 5, 2023, Farniok was signed to the Detroit Lions' practice squad. He was released on January 5, 2024. On January 23, Farniok re–signed with Detroit on a practice squad contract. He signed a reserve/future contract on January 30, 2024. Farniok was waived by the Lions on July 24.

=== Birmingham Stallions ===
On December 10, 2024, Farniok signed with the Birmingham Stallions of the United Football League (UFL). He was tried at guard and was released on March 20, 2025.

=== Arlington Renegades ===
On March 20, 2025, Farniok was claimed by the Arlington Renegades of the United Football League (UFL). He was switched to offensive tackle and appeared in 10 games with 6 starts at right tackle.

=== Columbus Aviators ===
On January 13, 2026, Farniok was selected by the Columbus Aviators in the 2026 UFL draft.

== Personal life ==
Farniok has three brothers who all played football at the NCAA Division I level, Derek, Tom, and Will.
