= Look at This Blue =

2022 poetry collection by Allison Adelle Hedge Coke

- Author: Allison Adelle Hedge Coke
- Publisher: Coffee House Press
- Publication date: March 29, 2022
- Pages: 168
- Awards: Emory Elliott Book Award
- ISBN: 978-1566896207
- Preceded by: Streaming

Look at This Blue is a 2022 poetry collection by Allison Adelle Hedge Coke, published by Coffee House Press. It won the 2022 Emory Elliott Book Award.

== Contents ==
The book is structured as a single poem. It combines various forms—lyric poetry in addition to archival records and taxonomy—to tackle the looming threat of the climate crisis in California and beyond.

The book was written during Hedge Coke's stay in Montenegro for the Fulbright Program in 2019. She stated it "was the culmination of 42 years living in the Golden State, learning its history, understanding the environment and knowing indigenous people's struggles."

== Creative reception ==
The book was longlisted for the 2022 National Book Award for Poetry and was a finalist for the 2023 Firecracker Award and the 2023 ASLE Creative Book Award.

Critics observed the book's tackling of issues pertaining to indigeneity and environmentalism. The Poetry Foundation said "Look at This Blue is an impressive lyrical accounting of California's biodiversity that also serves as a preemptive elegy for these plants, animals, and human beings, given the current climate crisis." World Literature Today likened the book to docupoetics, stating it had similar structure to Citizen: An American Lyric by Claudia Rankine, The Black Maria by Aracelis Girmay, The Ground I Stand on Is Not My Ground by Collier Nogues, and Whereas by Layli Long Soldier. The publication also lauded Hedge Coke's musicality and her "magnificent generosity of language". Quail Bell Magazine said "The collection will stay in your mind long after you read it, and you will remember it once you hear a birdsong you're unfamiliar with or see a plant whose name you don't know, and you'll wonder just what would happen if no one could ever identify them."
