= Jefferson High School (South Dakota) =

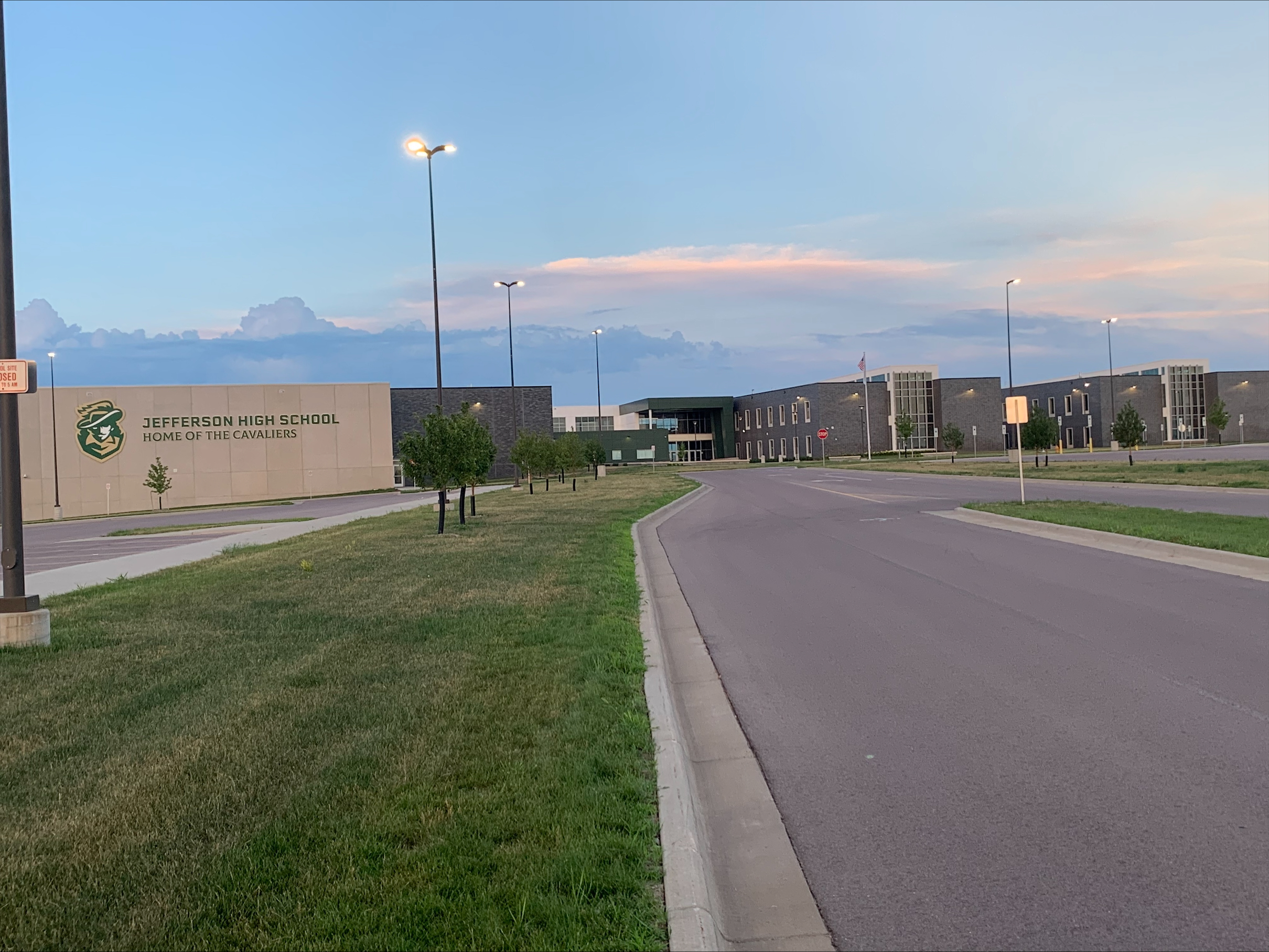

Location
- 1600 North Marion Road; Sioux Falls, South Dakota 57107; United States; 43°33′55.8″N 96°47′15.8″W

Information
- Type: Public high school
- Motto: All Means All
- School district: Sioux Falls School District
- Principal: Daniel L Conrad
- Grades: 9–12
- Enrollment: 1,784 (2025-2026)
- Colors: Green, Gold, Black
- Athletics conference: Metro
- Mascot: Cavalier
- Nickname: Jefferson
- Rival: Theodore Roosevelt High School
- Newspaper: Jefferson Chronicle
- Website: https://www.jhs.sf.k12.sd.us/o/jhs

Jefferson High School is a public high school in Sioux Falls, South Dakota, United States. It opened in the 2021–2022 school year as part of the Sioux Falls School District. Jefferson High School is one of four traditional high schools in the Sioux Falls School District.

== History ==
In January 2019, the Sioux Falls School District approved the naming of Jefferson High School and the initial design plans of the new building in Sioux Falls, however, the final design was finalized in spring 2019. Students enter the school from Marion Road and the building sits on the east side of the land. Construction started in June 2019 and was completed in the summer of 2021. Jefferson High School opened in the fall of 2021.

In March 2019, the district announced the school's mascot will be the "Cavaliers" and its colors will be Kelly green, gold, and black. The mascot was taken from the University of Virginia, which Jefferson founded, and the colors were vetted to ensure they were unique and not the same as nearby schools which they may compete against. They were selected via a committee of students from options narrowed down with votes, they have been approved by the school board.

In 2021 another school, New Tech High School merged with the newly built Jefferson High School. Albeit renamed to Project Based Learning or "PBL" in the H-Wing.

== Athletics ==
The Cavalier football team was coached from 2021 to 2024 by Vince Benedetto, who is now the tight ends coach at South Dakota State University. They have been led since 2025 by Eric Struck. The program has produced such notable players as Griffin Wilde, Thomas Heiberger, and Edward Whiting.

The Jefferson softball team has won two state championships in the team's first six years of existence, recently sanctioned. They are led by head coach Ed Whiting.

Jefferson girls' basketball is coached by former Augustana player Shaunteva Pruett. The team has made deep playoff runs in the first few years of existence. Notable girls basketball players include Jaidyn Dunn and Brinley Altenburg.

In 2022, Jefferson won its first 11AAA state football title in a 48-21 win over Harrisburg. The 2026 team repeated as champions, with a 42-26 win over Lincoln.
