= Roosevelt High School (South Dakota) =

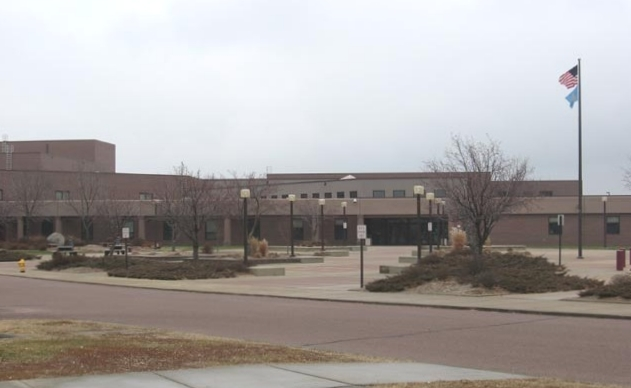

Location
- 6600 W. 41st Street; Sioux Falls, South Dakota 57106; United States; 43°30′59″N 96°48′29″W

Information
- School type: Public, Secondary
- Established: 1991; 35 years ago
- School district: Sioux Falls School District
- Principal: Tim Hazlett
- Staff: 107.22 (on an FTE basis)
- Grades: 9–12
- Enrollment: 1,815 (2025-2026)
- Student to teacher ratio: 16.56
- Colors: Cardinal, Gold, White
- Team name: Rough Riders
- Website: www.rhs.sf.k12.sd.us/o/rhs

Roosevelt High School is a public high school located in Sioux Falls, South Dakota, United States. It opened in 1991 and is one of four traditional high schools in the Sioux Falls School District.

== History ==
Roosevelt was the third high school in the Sioux Falls School District. The school opened for the 1991–1992 school year after a $17 million construction effort. Eventual overcrowding at the school was used as a pitching point for the referendum that later funded Jefferson High School.

== Athletics ==
Roosevelt athletic teams are nicknamed the Rough Riders and compete in the Metro Athletic Conference. The girls basketball team won 111 games in a row from 1997-01 along with 5 straight state championships. The 2021-22 boys basketball team achieved a perfect 22-0 season en route to back-to-back state championships.

State Championships
Sport	Years
Baseball	2003, 2011, 2013
Basketball (girls)	1997, 1998, 1999, 2000, 2001, 2005, 2006
Basketball (boys)	2000, 2014, 2021, 2022
Bowling (boys)	2005, 2007, 2008, 2009, 2015, 2018
Bowling (girls)	2016, 2017, 2019
Competitive Cheer	2014, 2015, 2020
Cross Country (boys)	2010, 2011, 2015
Cross Country (girls)	2008
Football	2006, 2007, 2011
Soccer (girls)	2002, 2012, 2013, 2021
Soccer (boys)	1999, 2000, 2019
Softball	2014, 2015, 2016, 2018
Track and Field (boys)	2000, 2015
Volleyball	1996, 2000, 2006, 2008, 2012
Golf (boys)	2005, 2009, 2019

== Performing arts ==
RHS has three competitive show choirs: the mixed-gender "Executive Suite" and "Rider Revolution" as well as the all-female "Capitol Harmony". The school also fields the only competitive inclusive show choir in the United States, "Unity, Inc." The program also hosts an annual competition.

RHS has a theater program that typically has two plays per semester, along with a summer show. The second show of the spring semester is usually a musical.

== Notable alumni ==
- Kellen Briggs, hockey player
- January Jones, actress in the television series Mad Men
- Joe Krabbenhoft, basketball coach
- Mason McCormick, professional football offensive lineman for the Pittsburgh Steelers
- Marcus Phillips, pitcher drafted 33rd overall by the Boston Red Sox in the 2025 MLB draft
