= Forest Park School District 91 =

School district in Illinois, United States

Address
- 424 Des Plaines Avenue Forest Park, Illinois, 60130; United States

District information
- Type: Public
- Grades: PreK–8
- NCES District ID: 1715450

Students and staff
- Students: 673

Other information
- Website: www.fpsd91.org

Forest Park School District 91 is a school district headquartered in Forest Park, Illinois, United States in the Chicago area. Dr. Elizabeth Alvarez is the current superintendent.

== Demographics ==
In 2014, the district enrolled approximately 1,000 students. It included two K-2 schools, two 3-5 schools, and one middle school with grades 6–8. As of 2018, the school enrollment is 782. The student population is 51.4% African American, 12.9% Hispanic, 3.7% Asian, and 22.5% White. Low income students comprise 52.7% of the district enrollment.

== Administrator and Faculty Salaries ==
As of 2018, the average administrator salary is $123,589, substantially above the state average of $107,279. On the other hand, the average teacher salary in the district is 62,042 which is below the state average of 65,721.

== National Equity Project and Columbus Day Removal ==
As an attempt to combat a persistent academic achievement gap between students of color and white students the district sought help from the National Equity Project. "In February 2018, the board approved a $40,000 contract with the National Equity Project, and board members and D91 administrators have since received training from the group."

In 2019, the district will celebrate Indigenous Peoples' Day in place of Columbus Day. "D91 administration has also had discussions about the narrative around Thanksgiving and the best way to navigate Thanksgiving pageants. '[We've discussed] how having kids dress up as Indians is inappropriate,' Cavallo said."

== Settlement of Age and Racial Discrimination Lawsuit ==
In March 2012, a former part-tme lunch attendant sued District 91. She alleged that the district fired her for "alerting the Illinois Municipal Retirement Fund that the district had removed her retirement benefits and taken away 40 sick days accrued over 16 years." The alleged victim also claimed that she was fired because of her age and race. In December 2012, the District 91 Board of Education approved a settlement of $10,000 to the alleged victim and a further $5,000 to her lawyer. All parties involved signed a non-disclosure agreement.

== Local Public High School Matriculation ==
In 1996, Joseph Scoliere, the superintendent of the Forest Park School District 91, stated that of the 91 students graduating from the 8th grade in June 1996, 25 enrolled at Proviso East High School, the zoned high school serving the Forest Park area.

== Grant-White Closure and Lease with OPRF ==
In 2022, the Board of Education unanimously voted to close Grant-White Elementary School due to low enrollment.

In 2025, the Board of Education signed a lease with Oak Park and River Forest High School (OPRF) allowing the latter to use much of Grant-White's first floor for their Community Integration Transition Education (CITE) program.

== Schools ==
- Forest Park Middle School
- Elementary schools:
  - Betsy Ross Elementary School
  - Field Stevenson Elementary School
  - Garfield Elementary School
  - Grant-White Elementary School
