= Tom Farniok =

American football player (born 1991)

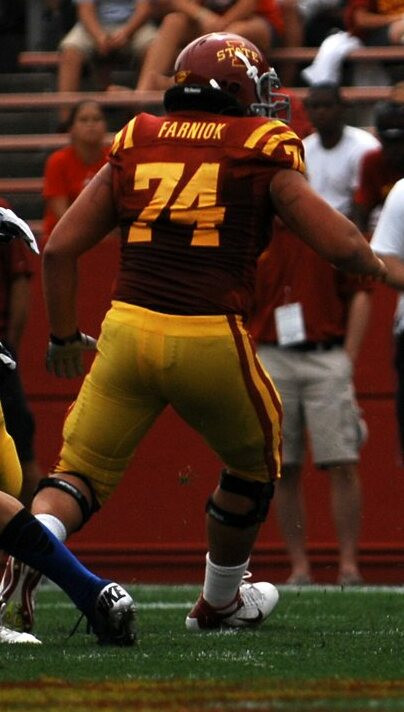
- Farniok with Iowa State in 2012

Profile
- Position: Center

Personal information
- Born: August 31, 1991 (age 35); Sioux Falls, South Dakota, U.S.
- Listed height: 6 ft 3 in (1.91 m)
- Listed weight: 301 lb (137 kg)

Career information
- High school: Sioux Falls (SD) Washington
- College: Iowa State (2010–2014)
- NFL draft: 2015: undrafted

Career history
- Minnesota Vikings (2015)*
- * Offseason or practice squad member only

Tom Farniok (born August 31, 1991) is an American former football center. He was signed by the Minnesota Vikings as an undrafted free agent in 2015. He played college football at Iowa State.

== Early life ==
Farniok was a three-year letterwinner at Washington High School in Sioux Falls, South Dakota. In 2008, he was named Class 11AA first-team All-State. As a sophomore, he was an honorable mention All-conference. He was named Class 11AA First-team All-State and offensive MVP of All-City Team. He was a first-team Greater Dakota All-Conference as senior and junior. As a senior, he served as team captain of Washington Warrior team that went 13-0 and claimed the Class 11AA state title (Washington's first since 1976). In addition, he was also an academic All-Conference and All-State in 2009.

Farniok also lettered in basketball and track & field at Washington HS. He had a personal-best throw of 43.73 meters (143 feet, 5 inches) in the discus as a senior. He also recorded a top-throw of 13 meters (42 feet, 8 inches) in the shot put at the Dakota Relays.

Considered as a two-star recruit by Rivals.com, Farniok chose Iowa State over offers from North Dakota, North Dakota State and South Dakota State.

== Professional career ==
Pre-draft measurables
Height	Weight	Arm length	Hand span	40-yard dash	10-yard split	20-yard split	20-yard shuttle	Three-cone drill	Vertical jump	Broad jump	Bench press
6 ft 3 1/8 in (1.91 m)	301 lb (137 kg)	31 1/4 in (0.79 m)	9 3/4 in (0.25 m)	5.39 s	1.76 s	3.06 s	4.75 s	7.85 s	30 in (0.76 m)	9 ft 0 in (2.74 m)	23 reps
All values from Pro Day

Farniok did not hear his name called during the 2015 NFL draft, but signed with the Minnesota Vikings as an undrafted free agent shortly after the draft. He was subsequently released prior to the commencement of the 2015 season.
