= Sioux Falls School District =

School district in South Dakota, US

Location
- Sioux Falls, South Dakota United States

District information
- Type: Public
- Grades: PK–12
- President: Nan Kelly
- Superintendent: Jamie Nold
- Accreditation: South Dakota Department of Education

Students and staff
- Students: 24,000

Other information
- Website: www.sf.k12.sd.us

Sioux Falls School District 49-5 is a public school district located in Sioux Falls, South Dakota, United States. The district has 23 elementary schools, 6 middle schools and 4 high schools. As of fall 2025, the Sioux Falls School District serves over 24,000 students.

Most of the district is in Minnehaha County, while portions are in Lincoln County. Most portions of the district are in Sioux Falls, but some are unincorporated areas.

With the opening of Jefferson High School in 2021, the school district has a high school named for each of the four United States Presidents depicted on Mount Rushmore.

== Schools ==
=== Magnet schools ===
- Career and Technical Education Academy
- Axtell Park Building

=== High schools ===
- Jefferson High School
- Lincoln High School
- Roosevelt High School
- Washington High School

=== Middle schools ===
- Axtell Park Building
- Ben Reifel Middle School
- Edison Middle School
- George McGovern Middle School
- Memorial Middle School
- Patrick Henry Middle School
- Whittier Middle School

=== Elementary schools ===
- All-City
- Anne Sullivan
- Challenge Center
- Cleveland
- Discovery
- Eugene Field A+
- Garfield
- Harvey Dunn
- Hawthorne
- Hayward
- Horace Mann
- John F. Kennedy (JFK)
- John Harris
- Laura B. Anderson
- Laura Wilder
- Lowell
- Marcella LeBeau
- Oscar Howe
- Renberg
- R.F. Pettigrew
- Robert Frost
- Rosa Parks
- Sonia Sotomayor
- Susan B. Anthony
- Terry Redlin
