= South Dakota Arts Council =

The South Dakota Arts Council, established in 1966, is funded by the state of South Dakota and the National Endowment for the Arts. It seeks to "makes quality arts accessible throughout the state by providing grants, services and information to artists, arts organizations, schools and the public." The Governor of South Dakota appoints its board members.

The Council sponsored apprenticeships in the arts during the 2000s.
