= Lincoln High School (South Dakota) =

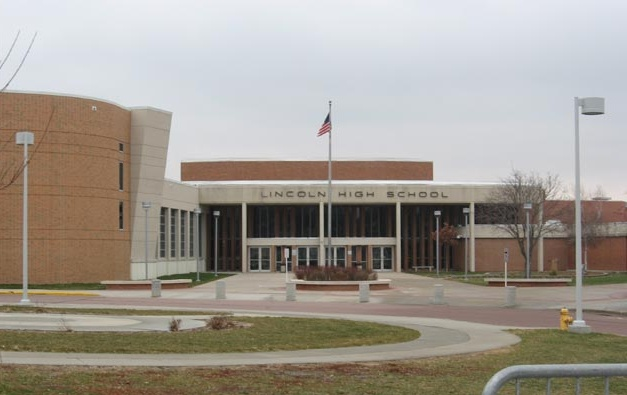
- Main entrance of Lincoln High School

Location
- 2900 South Cliff Avenue; Sioux Falls, South Dakota 57105; United States; 43.5186°N 96.7092°W

Information
- School type: Public, Secondary
- Established: 1955, rebuilt in 2007
- School district: Sioux Falls School District
- Superintendent: Jane Stavem
- Principal: Laura Raeder
- Staff: 118.49 (FTE)
- Grades: 9-12
- Enrollment: 1,937 (2025-2026)
- Student to teacher ratio: 16.32
- Colors: Red, white, blue
- Mascot: Murphy the Patriot
- Newspaper: The Statesman
- School Song: Go Lincoln High!
- Website: www.sf.k12.sd.us/o/lhs

Lincoln High School is a high school in Sioux Falls, South Dakota. Lincoln was included in the list of the top 1200 public schools in the US by Newsweek in their May 8, 2006 issue, ranking at 1,027. The school was first established in 1955. The original building was torn down in 2003 and the school reopened in 2007 in a new building.

== Extracurricular activities ==
=== Marching band ===
The Lincoln High School Patriot Marching Band consists of 250 members, composed of woodwinds, brass, color guard, front ensemble, and a drumline. The band performs in regional field competitions and street competitions. The band has appeared in the Rose Parade in Pasadena, California in 1992, 1998, 2005 and 2013. The band marched in the 1994, 2000, 2008, and 2024 Macy's Thanksgiving Day Parade. Lincoln High School was a finalist at the Bands of America Super Regional in St. Louis, Missouri in 2015, 2017, 2021, and 2024, as well as the Super Regional in Indianapolis, Indiana in 2023.

=== DECA ===
The Sioux Falls Lincoln High School DECA program consists of students pursuing a future in business and marketing. The 2013-2014 International President of DECA, Carter Christensen, was a graduate of Lincoln High School, the first National Officer elected from South Dakota.

== Athletics ==
Lincoln High School competes in the Metro Athletic Conference and their teams are called the Patriots.

State Championships
| Sport | Year (s) |
|---|---|
| Football | 2008, 2013, 2014, 2023, 2024 |
| Boys' Basketball | 1970, 1976, 1995, 2009, 2015, 2016 |
| Girls' Basketball | 2013 |
| Cross Country (boys) | 1970, 1971, 1972, 1973, 1974, 1975, 1976, 1978, 1979, 1982, 1984, 2012, 2013, 2014, 2016, 2018, 2019, 2020, 2023, 2024, 2025, 2026 |
| Cross Country (girls) | 2015, 2016, 2018, 2019 |
| Golf (boys) | 2012, 2018, 2020 |
| Soccer (boys) | 2017, 2023, 2024 |
| Soccer (girls) | 2014 |
| Tennis (boys) | 1971, 1976, 1977, 1978, 1991, 1995, 1996, 1997, 1998, 1999, 2002, 2004, 2014, 2015, 2016, 2017, 2018, 2019, 2021, 2022, 2023, 2024 |
| Tennis (girls) | 1981, 1982, 1984, 1985, 1988, 1997, 1998, 1999, 2000, 2001, 2016, 2017, 2018, 2019, 2020, 2023 |
| Track & Field (boys) | 1967, 1968, 1969, 1970, 1972, 1973, 1974, 1975, 1976, 1989, 2014, 2016, 2017, 2018, 2019, 2021, 2024, 2025 |
| Track & Field (girls) | 1975, 1976, 1987, 2016, 2017, 2019, 2023 |
| Volleyball | 1993, 2004, 2010, 2011 |

== Notable alumni ==
Shayna Baszler, professional wrestler and former mixed martial artist
