= Royal Academy Exhibition of 1882 =

1882 art exhibition in London

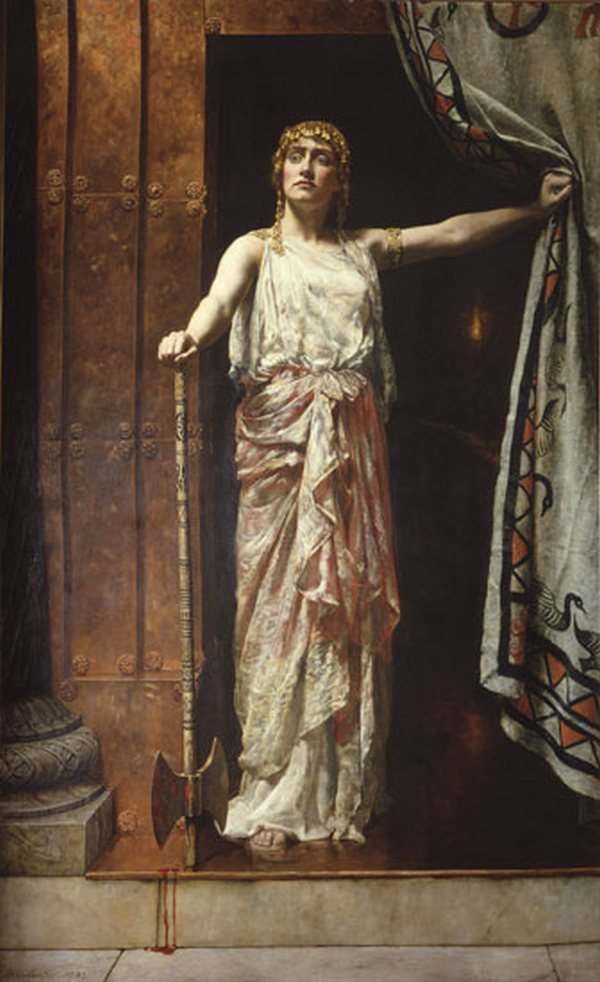
Clytemnestra by John Collier

The Royal Academy Exhibition of 1882 was the hundred and fourteenth annual Summer Exhibition of the British Royal Academy of Arts. It was held from 1 May to 7 August 1882 at Burlington House in Piccadilly in London. More than a thousand artists and architects of the later Victorian era displayed works.

John Singer Sargent made his debut at the Royal Academy with his portrait painting Doctor Pozzi at Home, although it attracted virtually no attention. The Scottish artist John Pettie displayed the history painting The Duke of Monmouth's Interview with James II depicting the aftermath of the Monmouth Rebellion. Clytemnestra by John Collier was inspired by the play Agamemnon by Aeschylus, depicting the Mycenaen queen just after she has killed her husband in revenge. Stanhope Forbes, later a key figure in the Newlyn School considered a British response to French impressionism, exhibited A Street in Brittany. Elizabeth Thompson displayed the latest in her series of war art with Floreat Etona! capturing a scene from the First Boer War.

Many of the best-established painters were represented including John Everett Millais, William Powell Frith and the President of the Royal Academy Frederic Leighton. The quality of the sculptures on display was noted by the press and was mentioned by Leighton in his speech at the annual Royal Academy dinner. The bronze sculpture Teucer by Hamo Thornycroft was acquired for the nation by the Chantrey Bequest. Amongst the influential foreign sculptors who displayed works were Alphonse Legros and Auguste Rodin, who made his Royal Academy debut. Rodin displayed a Bust of Saint John, but also sent work to be exhibited at the rival Grosvenor Gallery.

== Gallery ==
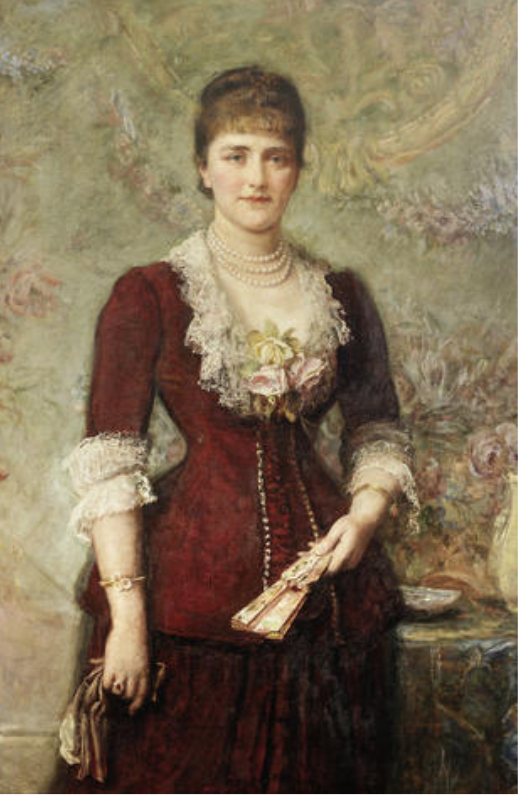
Portrait of Lucy Stern by John Everett Millais

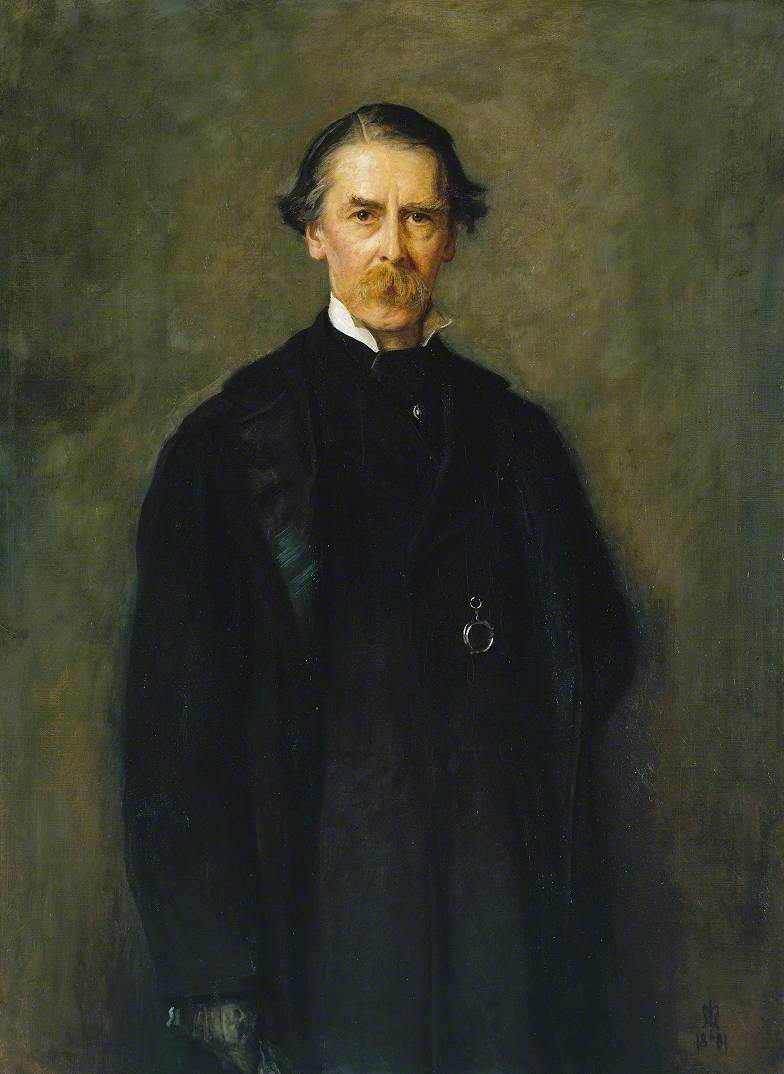
Portrait of Sir Henry Thompson by John Everett Millais

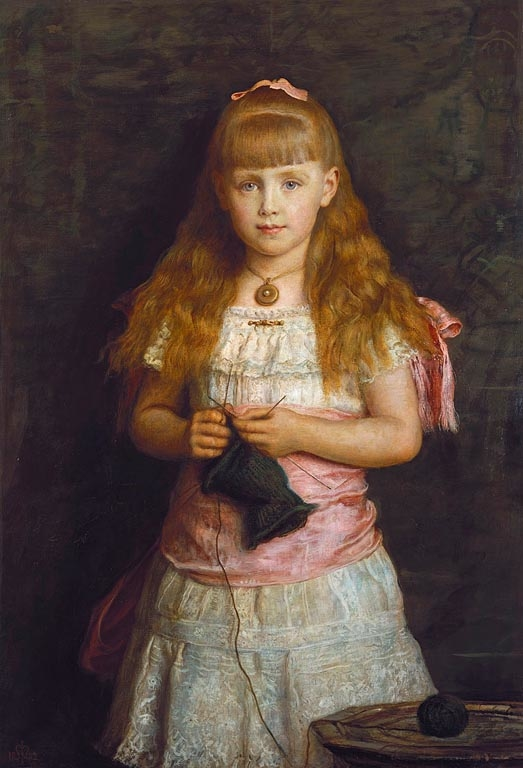
Portrait of Princess Marie of Edinburgh by John Everett Millais

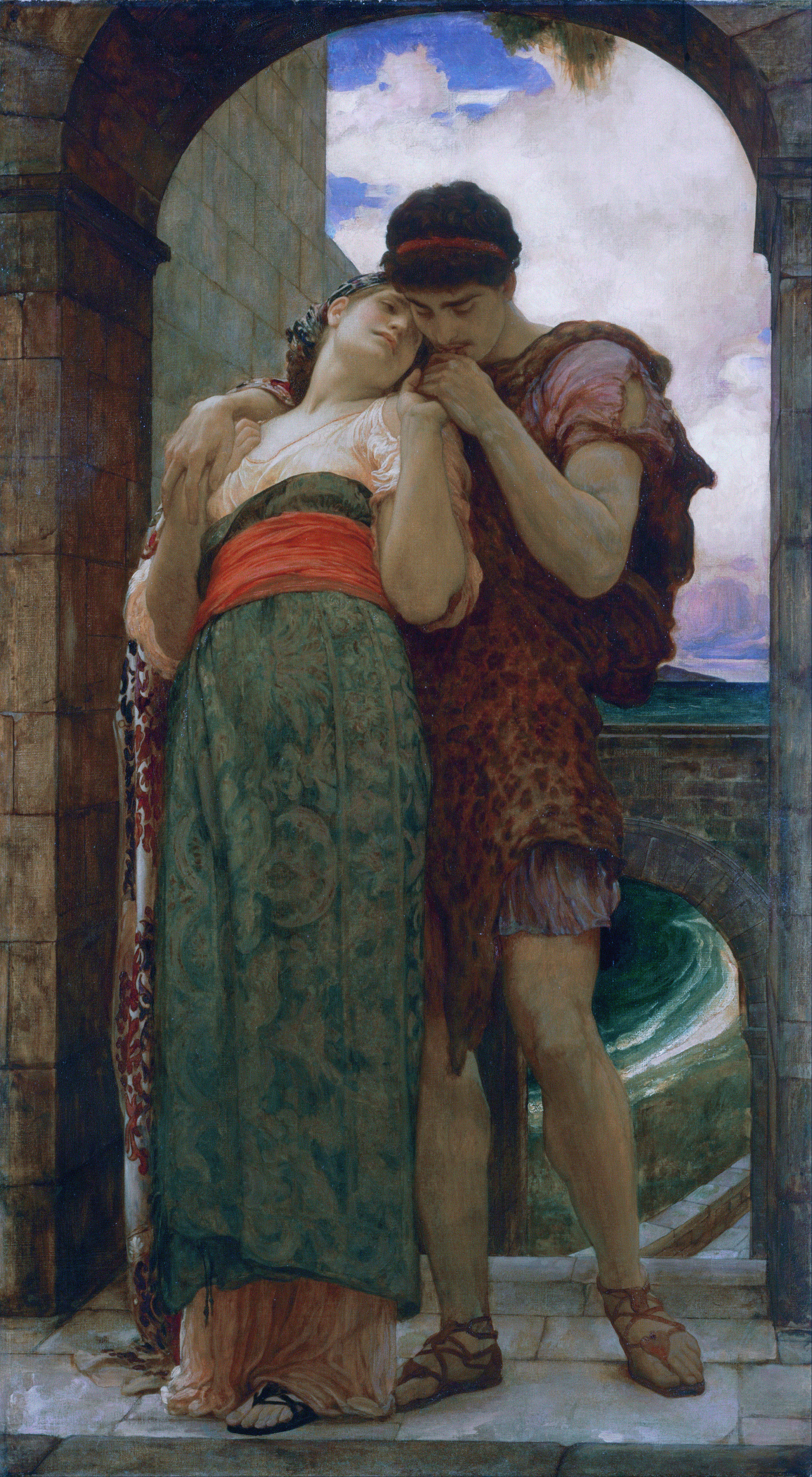
Wedded by Frederic Leighton

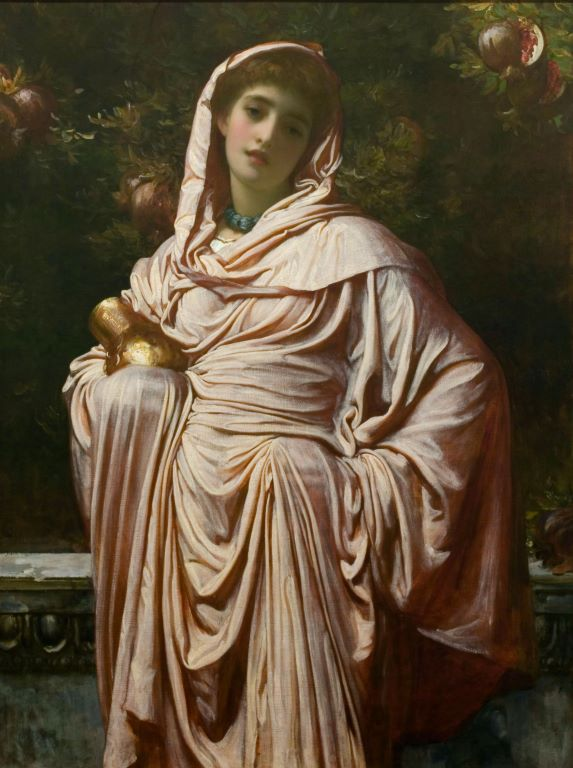
Melittion by Frederic Leighton

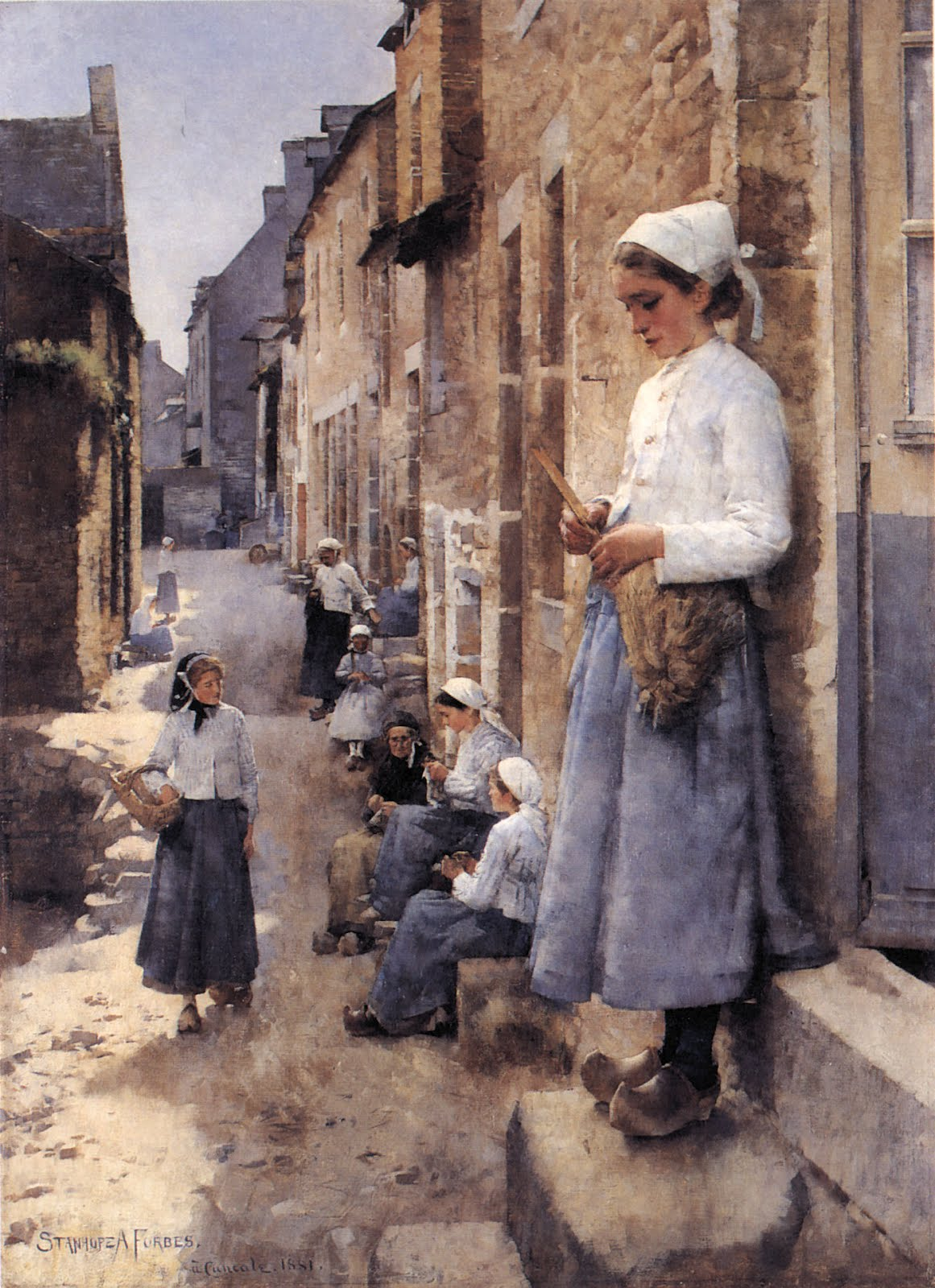
A Street in Brittany by Stanhope Forbes

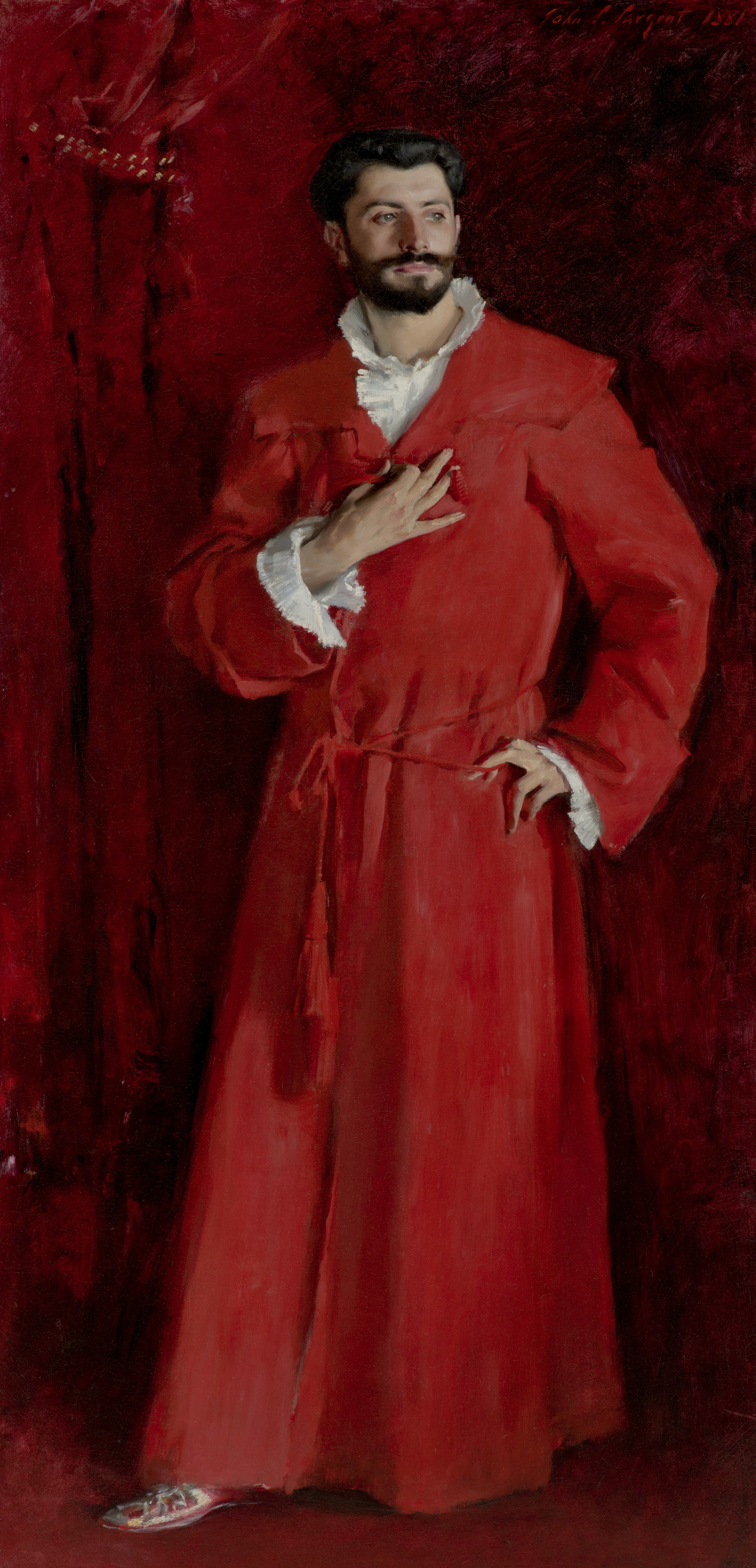
Doctor Pozzi at Home by John Singer Sargent

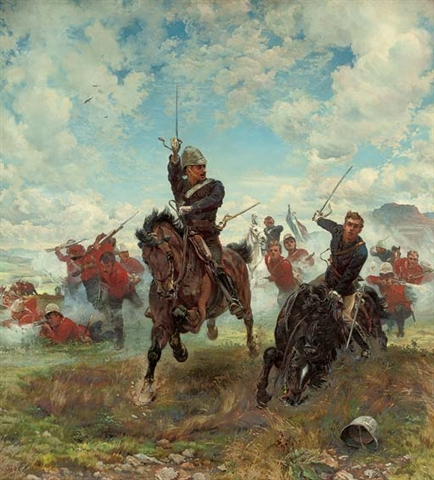
Floreat Etona! by Elizabeth Thompson

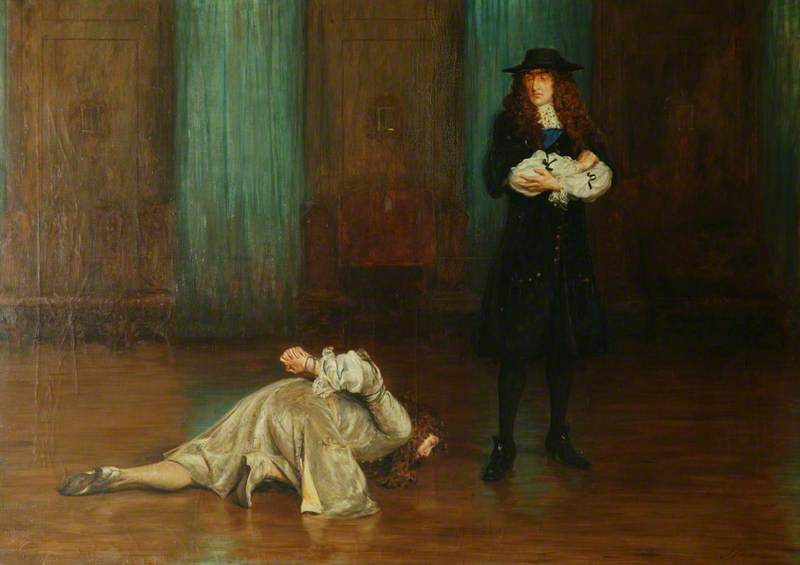
The Duke of Monmouth's Interview with James II by John Pettie

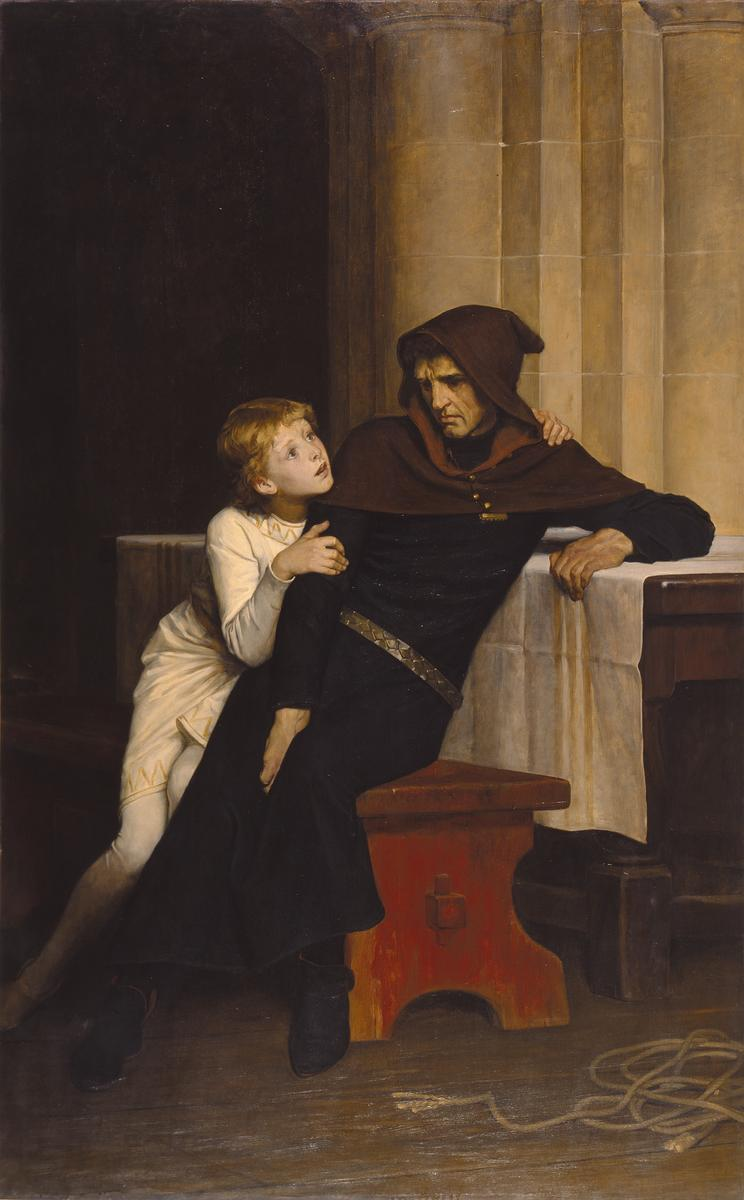
Prince Arthur and Hubert by William Frederick Yeames

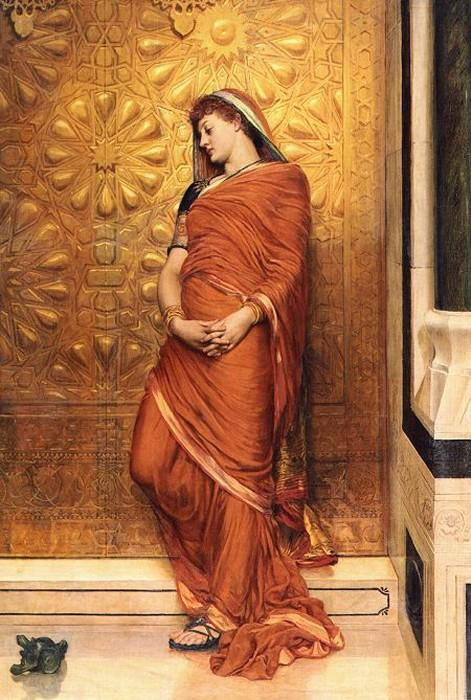
At the Golden Gate by Valentine Cameron Prinsep

Death of Siward the Strong by Valentine Cameron Prinsep

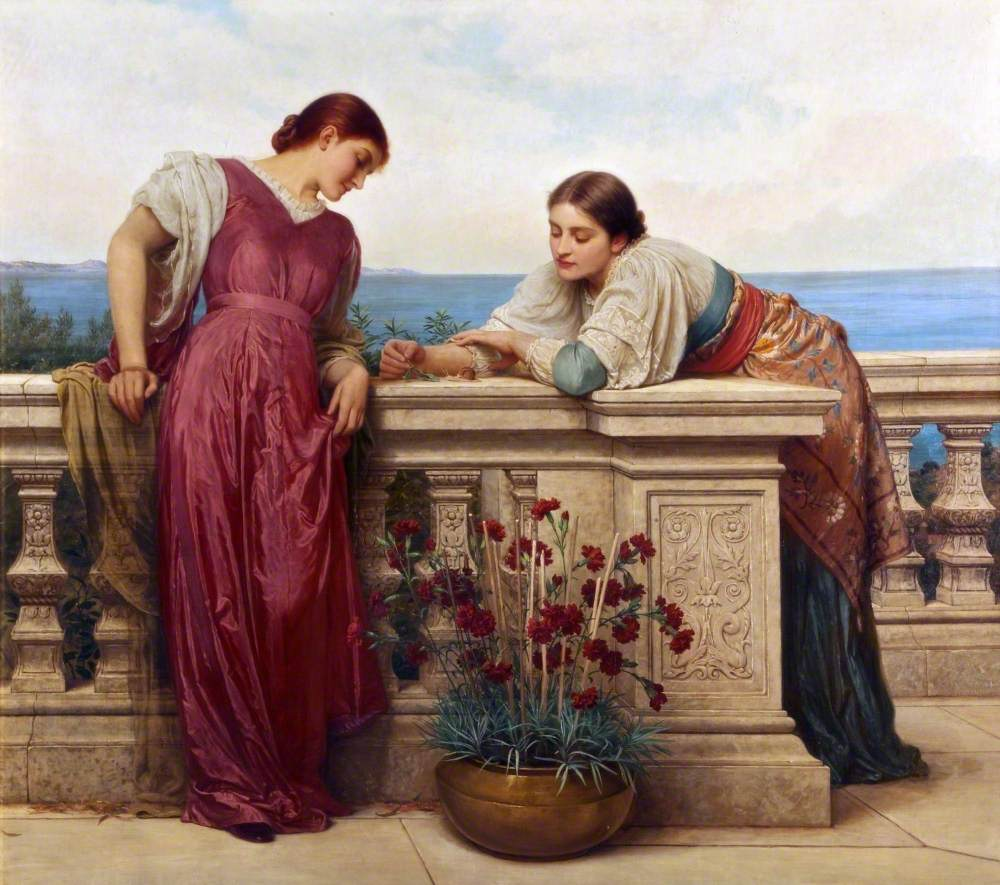
Dolce far niente by Charles Edward Perugini

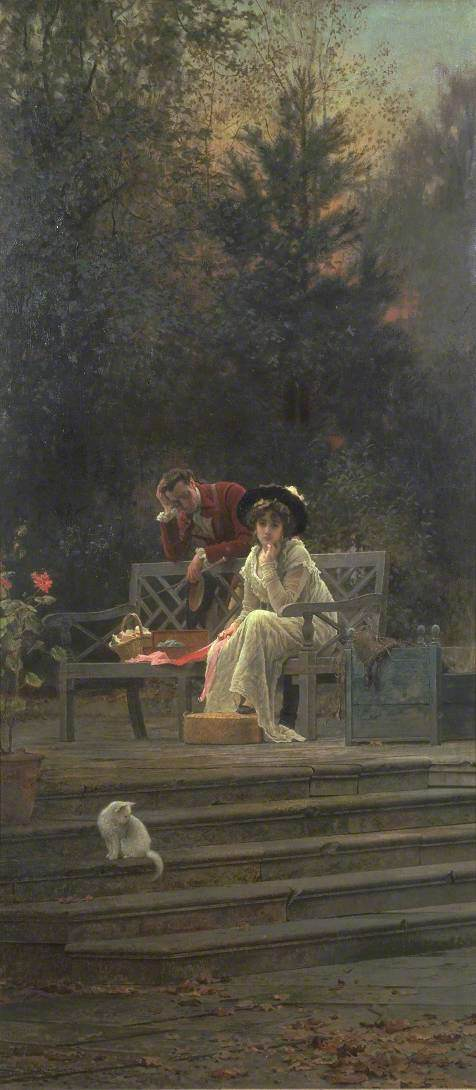
Il y en a toujours un autre by Marcus Stone

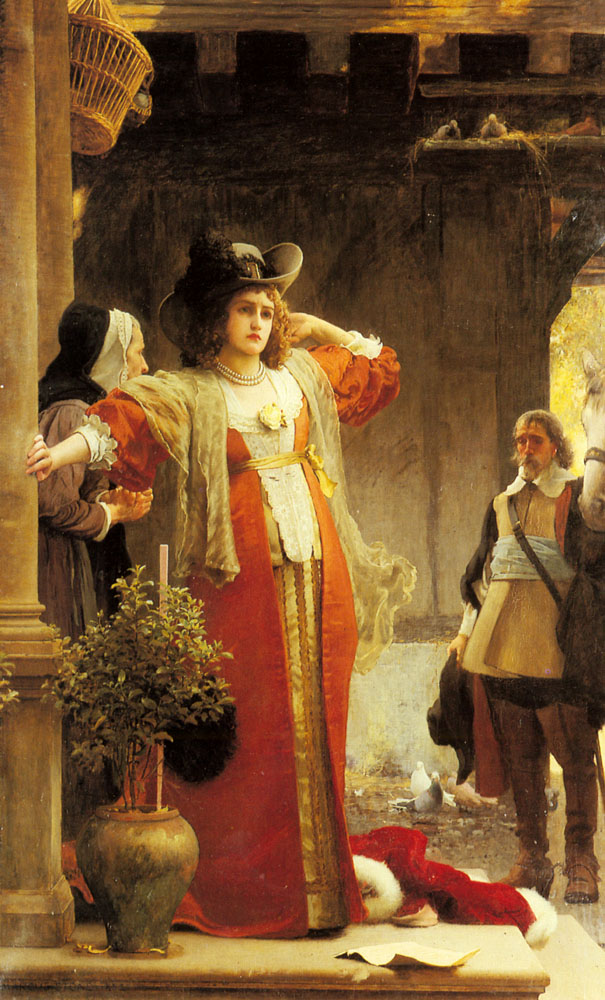
Bad News by Marcus Stone

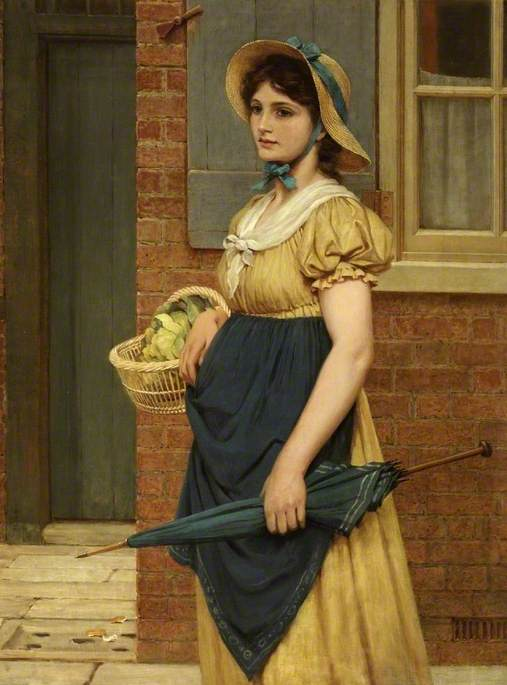
Sally in Our Alley by George Dunlop Leslie

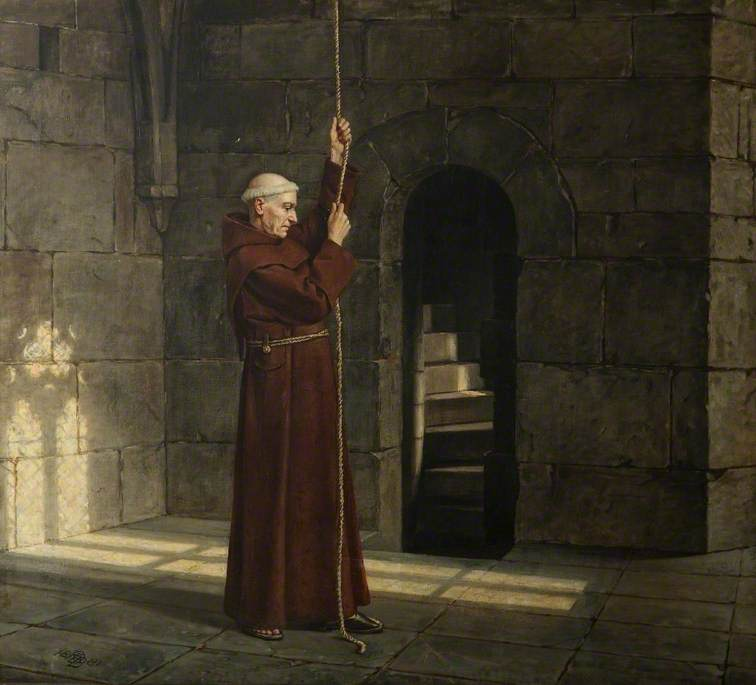
Vespers by Robert Barrett Browning

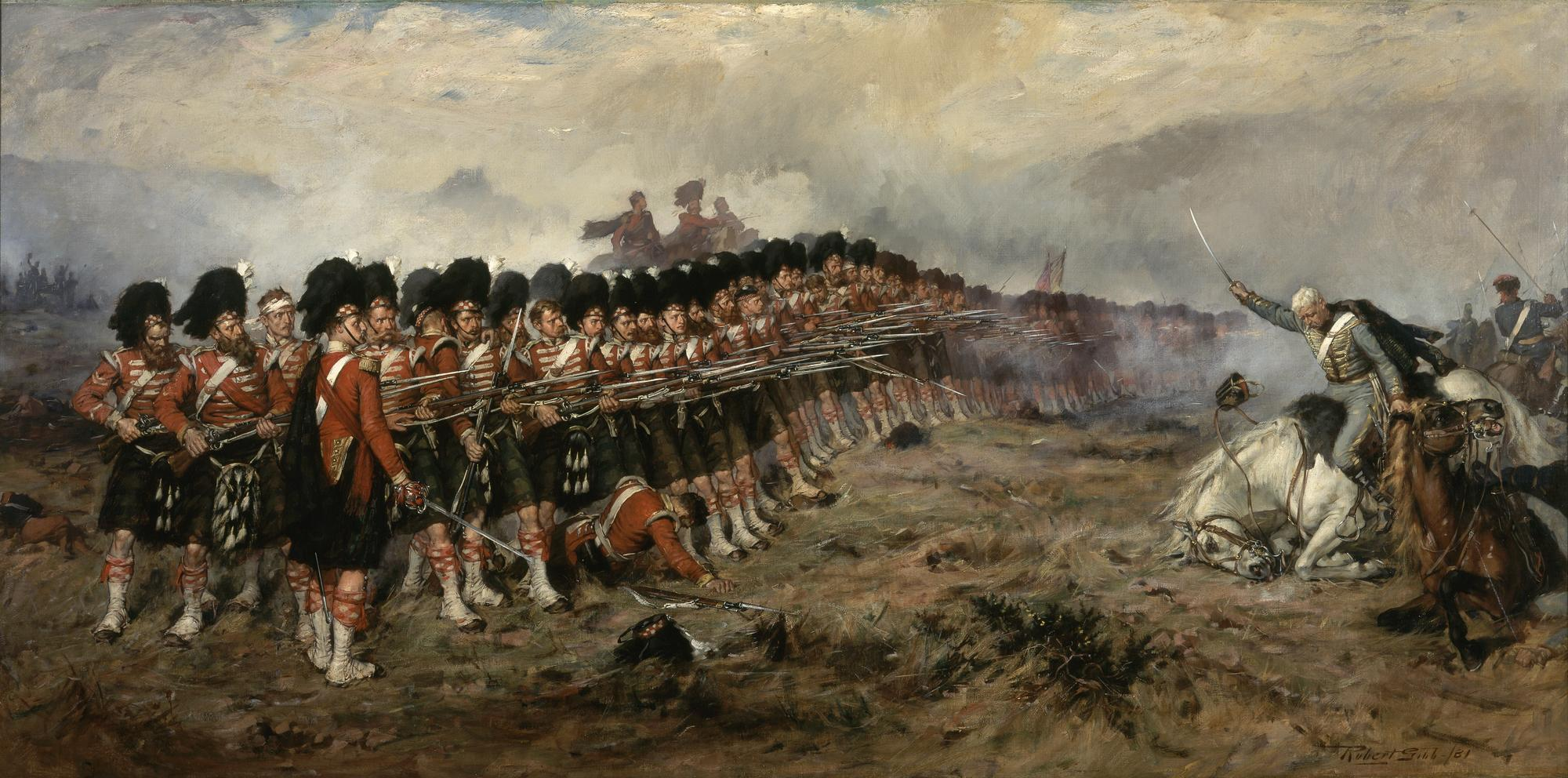
The Thin Red Line by Robert Gibb

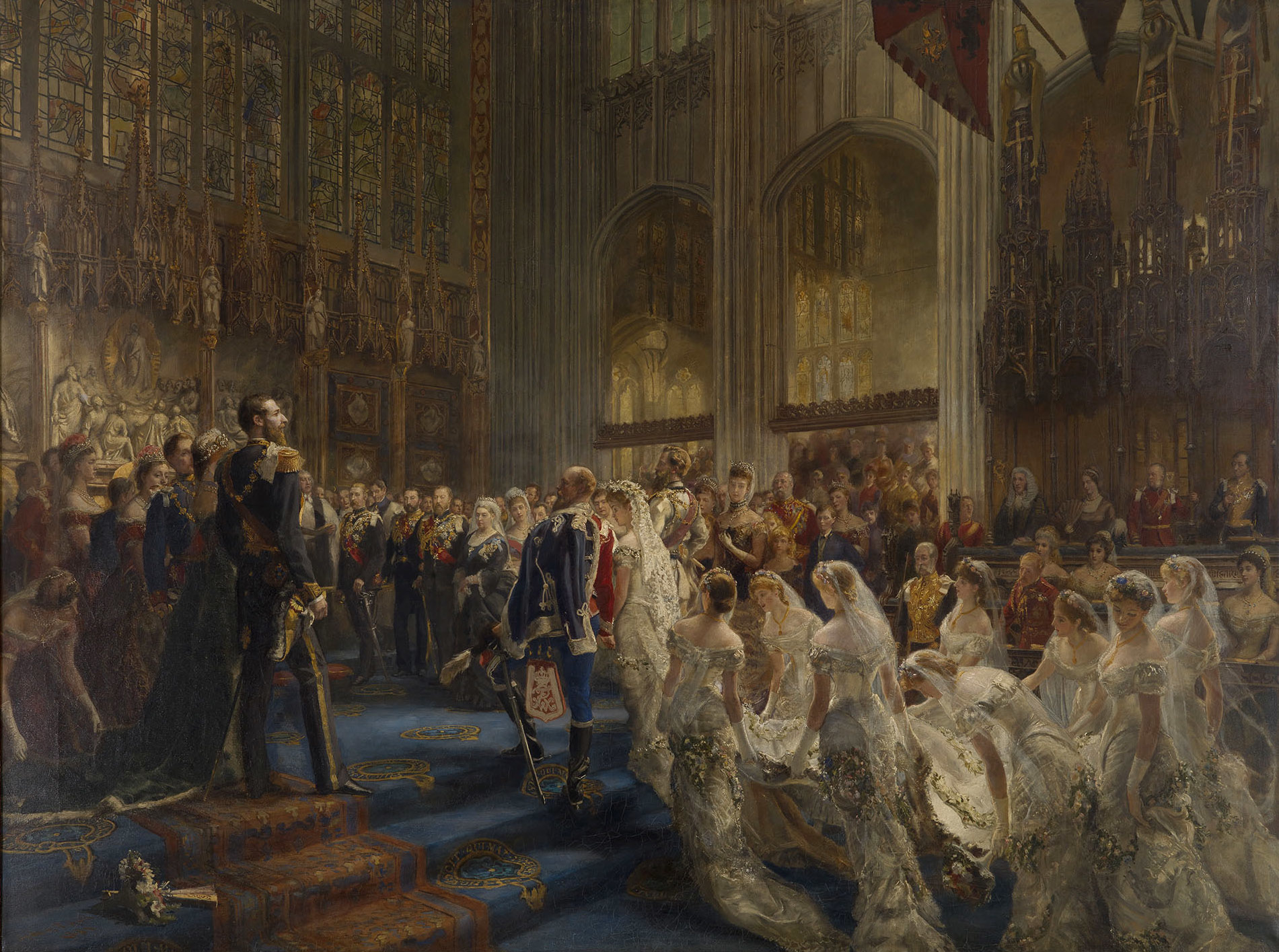
The Marriage of the Duke of Connaught by Sydney Prior Hall

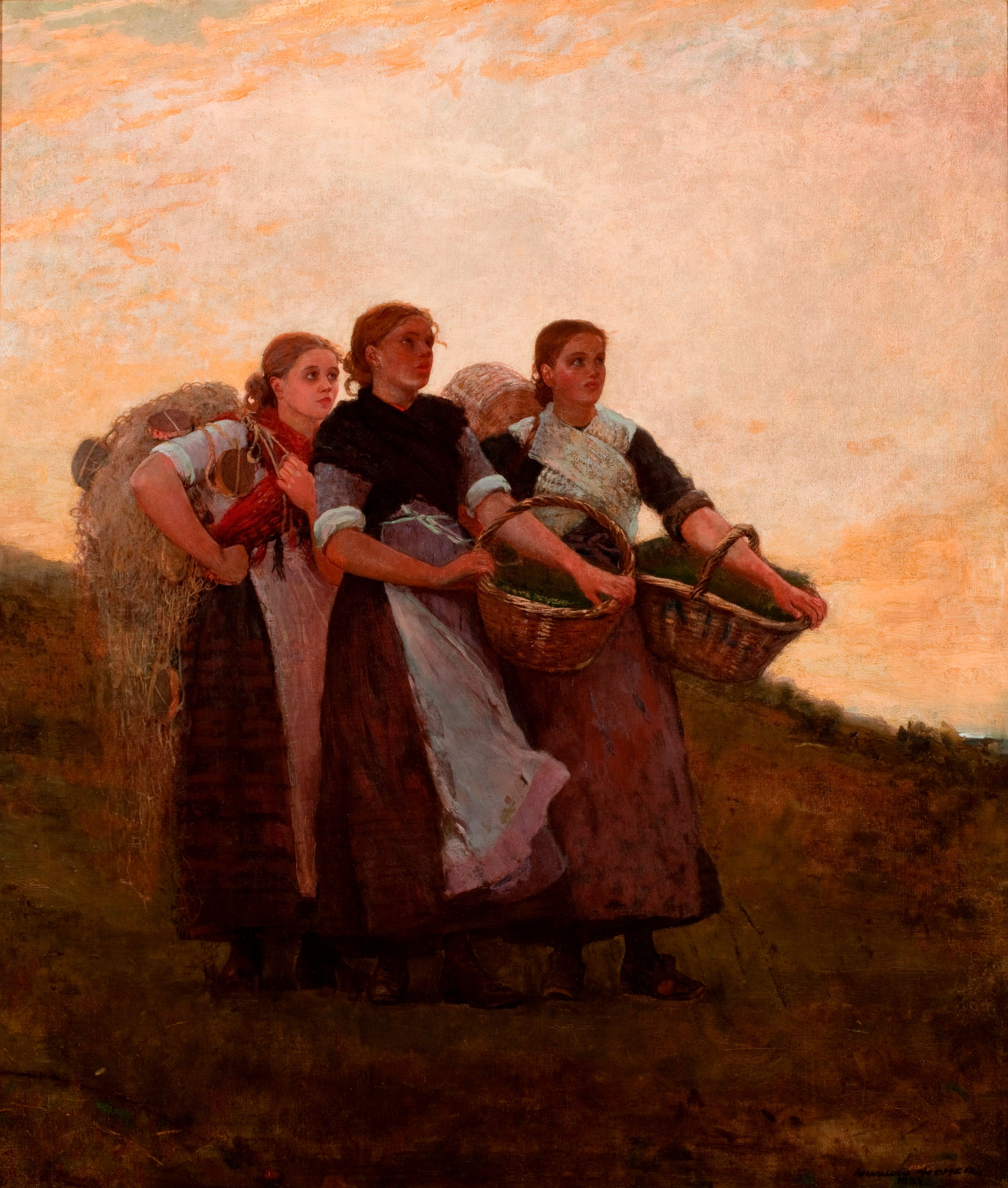
Hark! The Lark by Winslow Homer

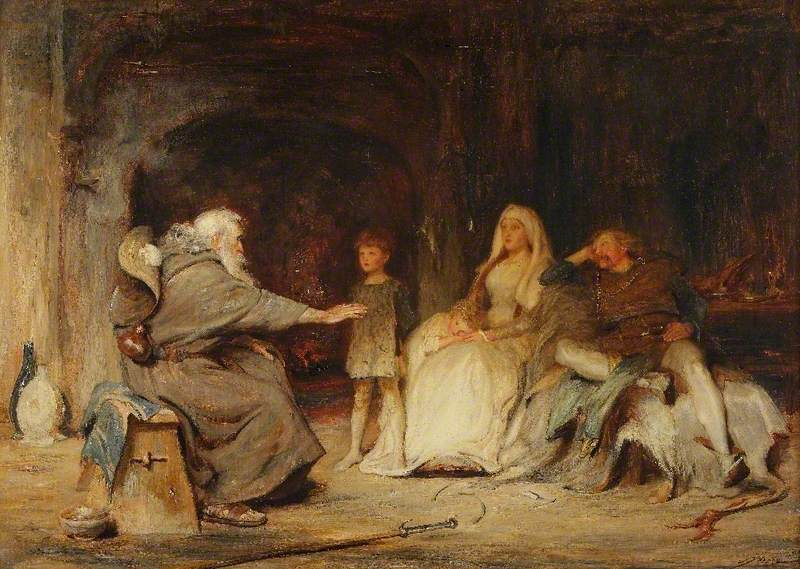
The Palmer by John Pettie

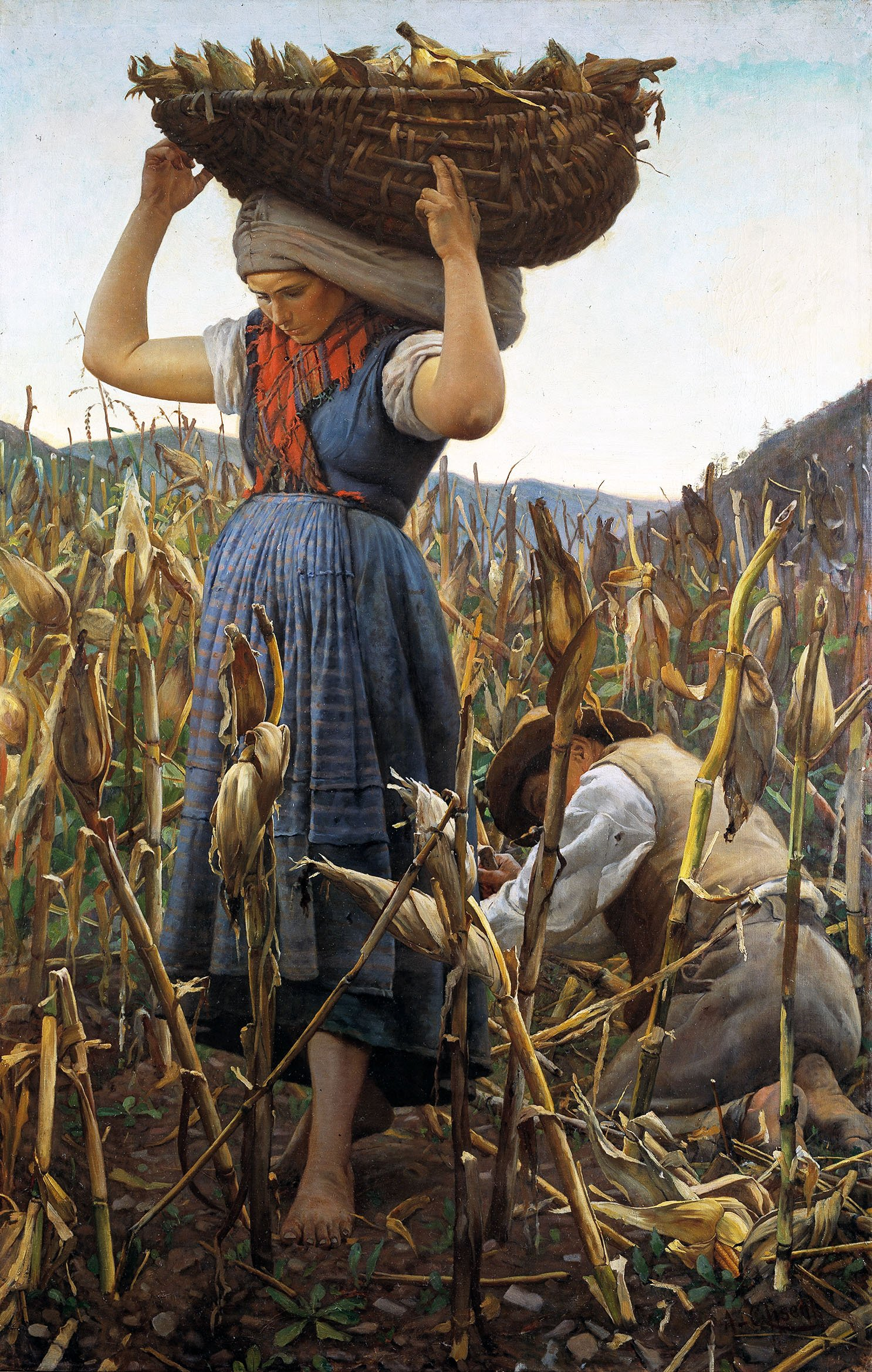
The Corn Harvest by Achille Glisenti

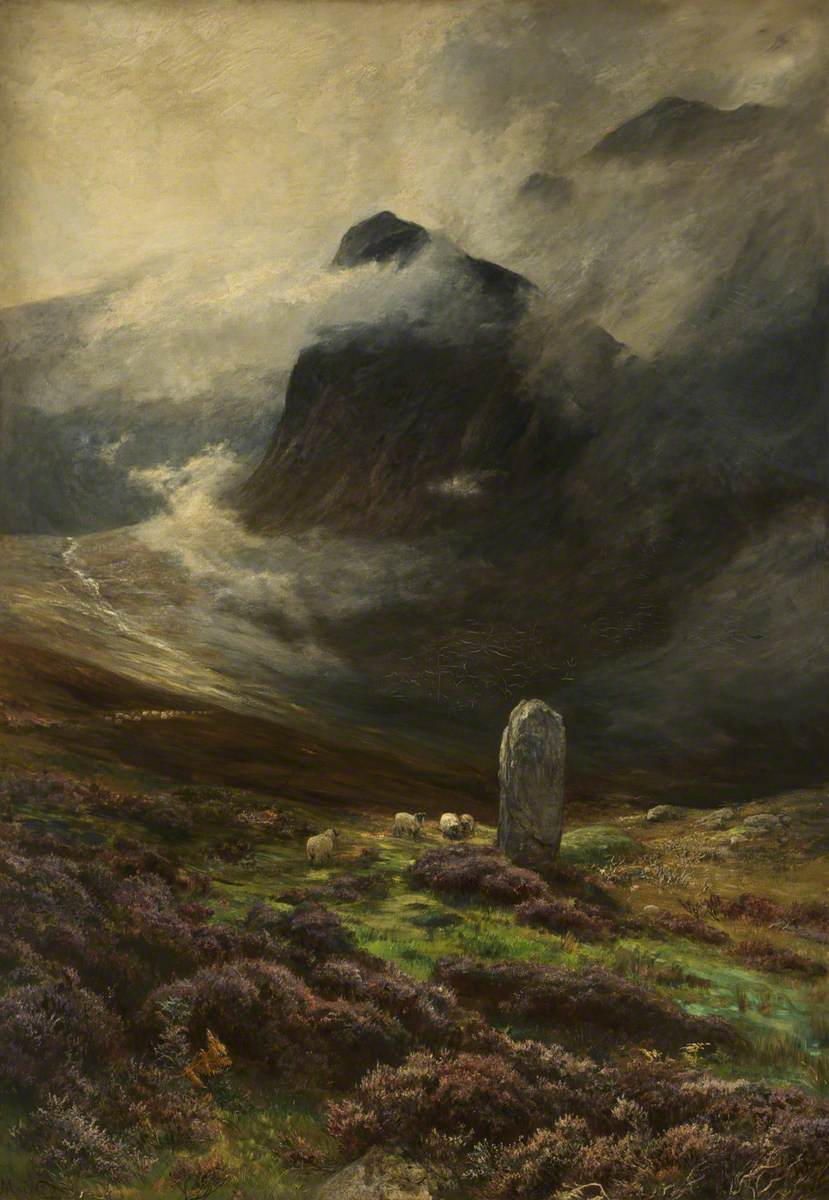
Ossian's Grave by John MacWhirter

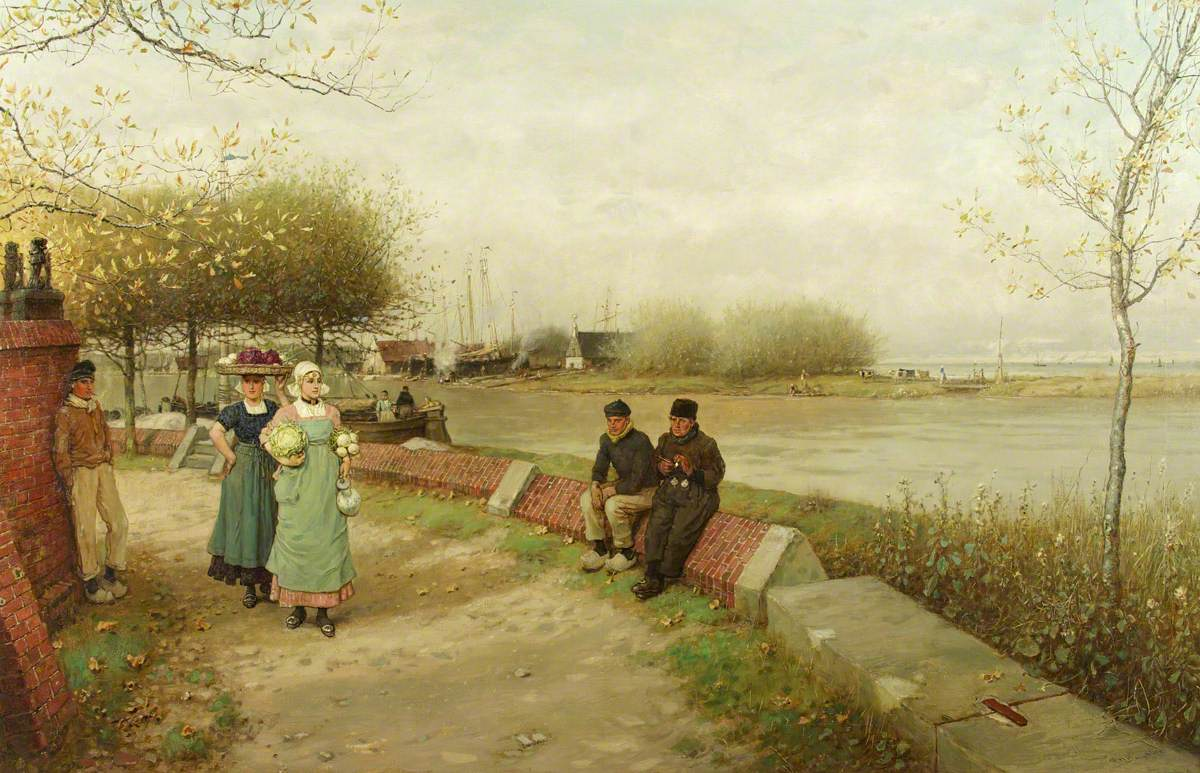
An Exchange of Compliments, Muiden by George Henry Boughton

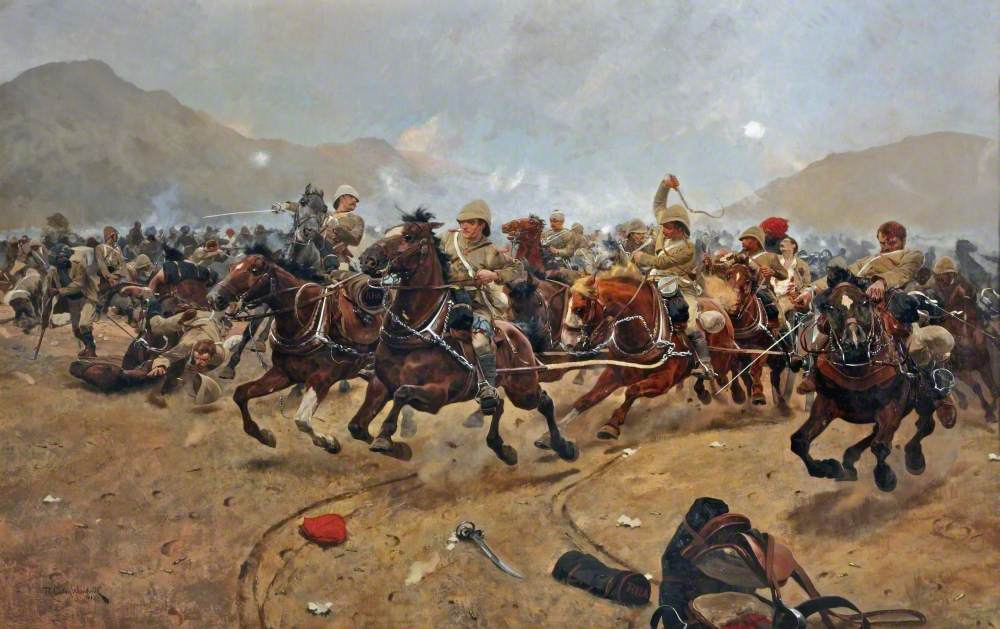
Maiwand 1880, Saving the Guns by Richard Caton Woodville

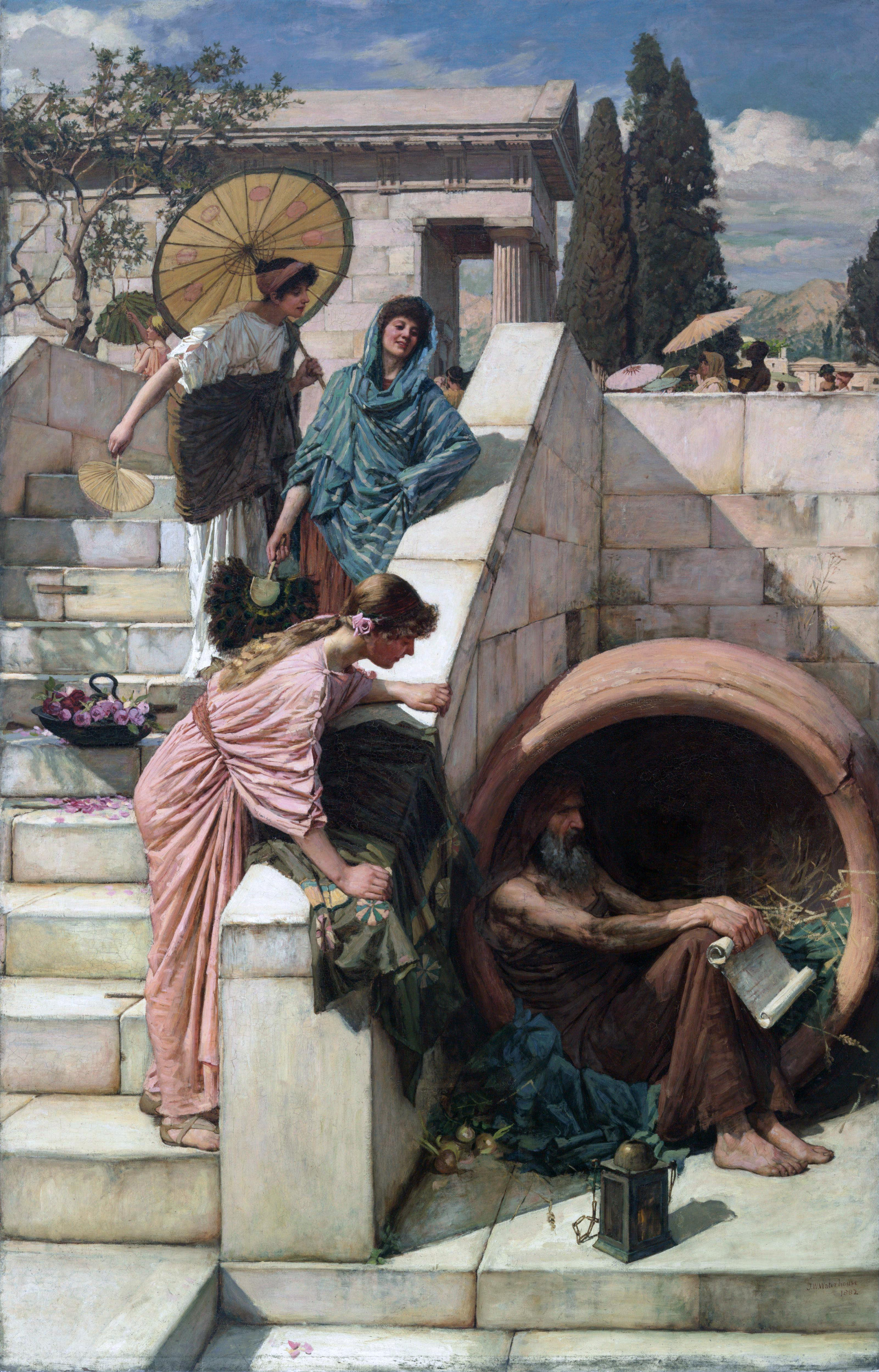
Diogenes by John William Waterhouse

Welcome as Flowers in Spring by William Frederick Yeames

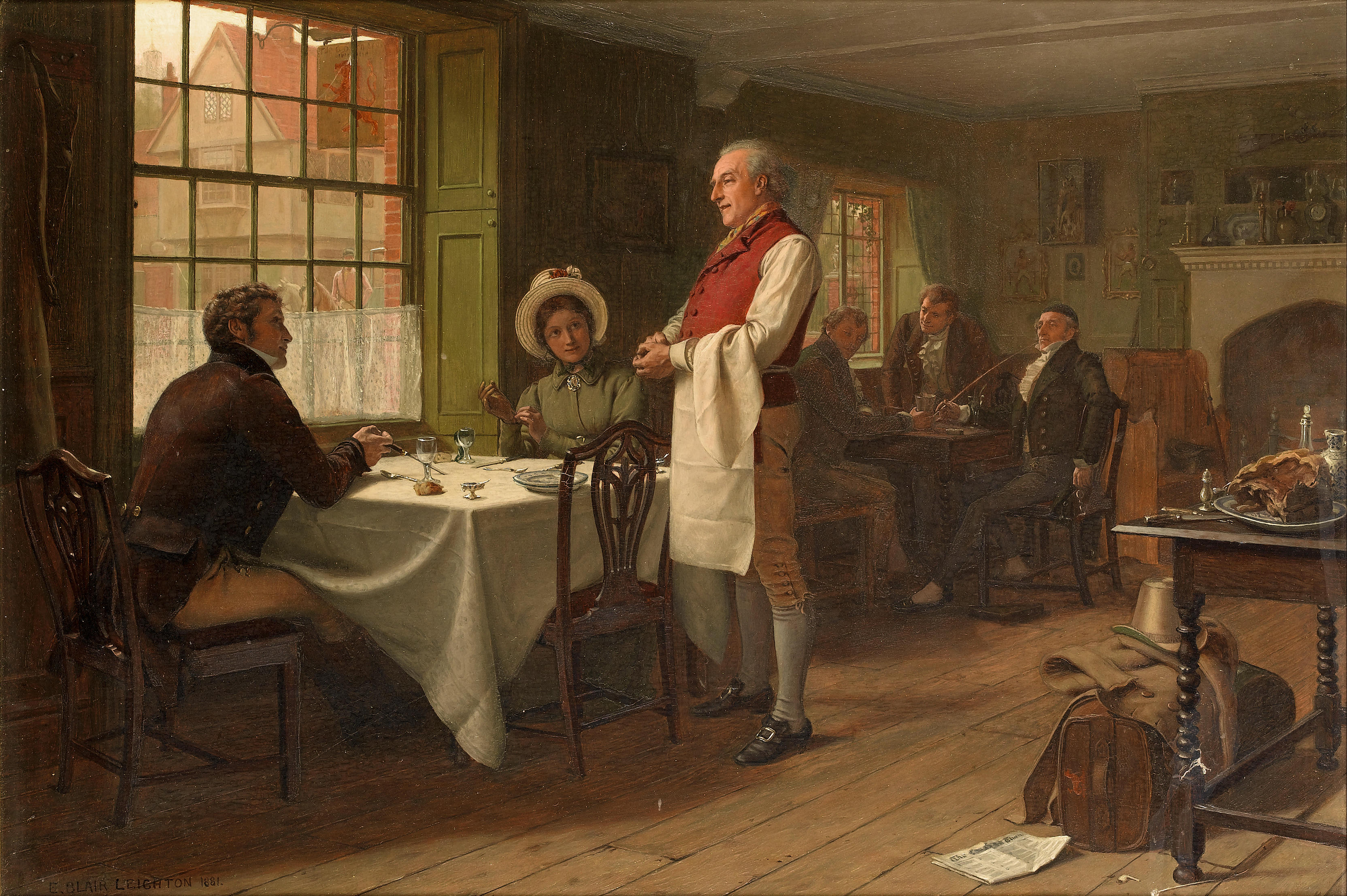
Interesting Strangers by Edmund Blair Leighton

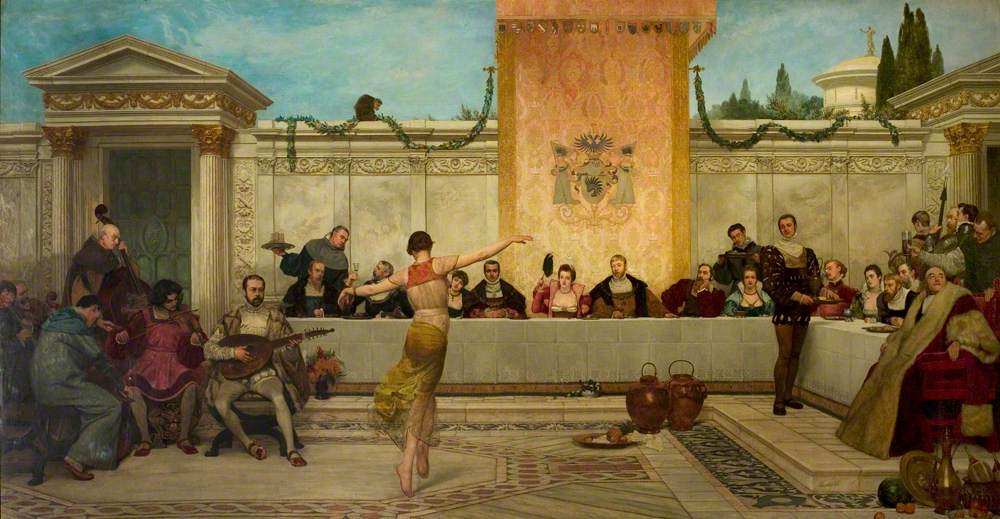
The Banquet by James Dromgole Linton

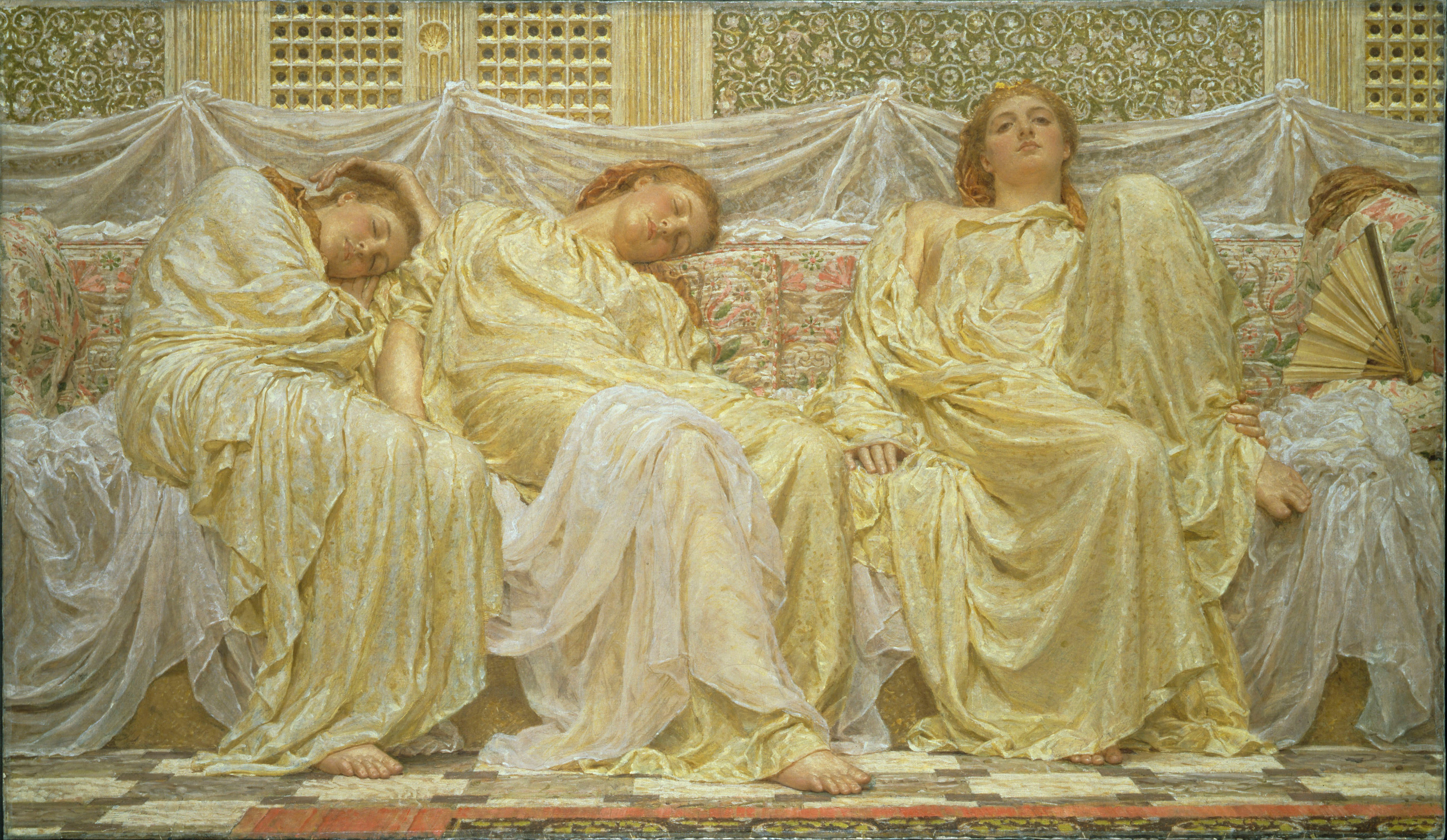
Dreamers by Albert Joseph Moore

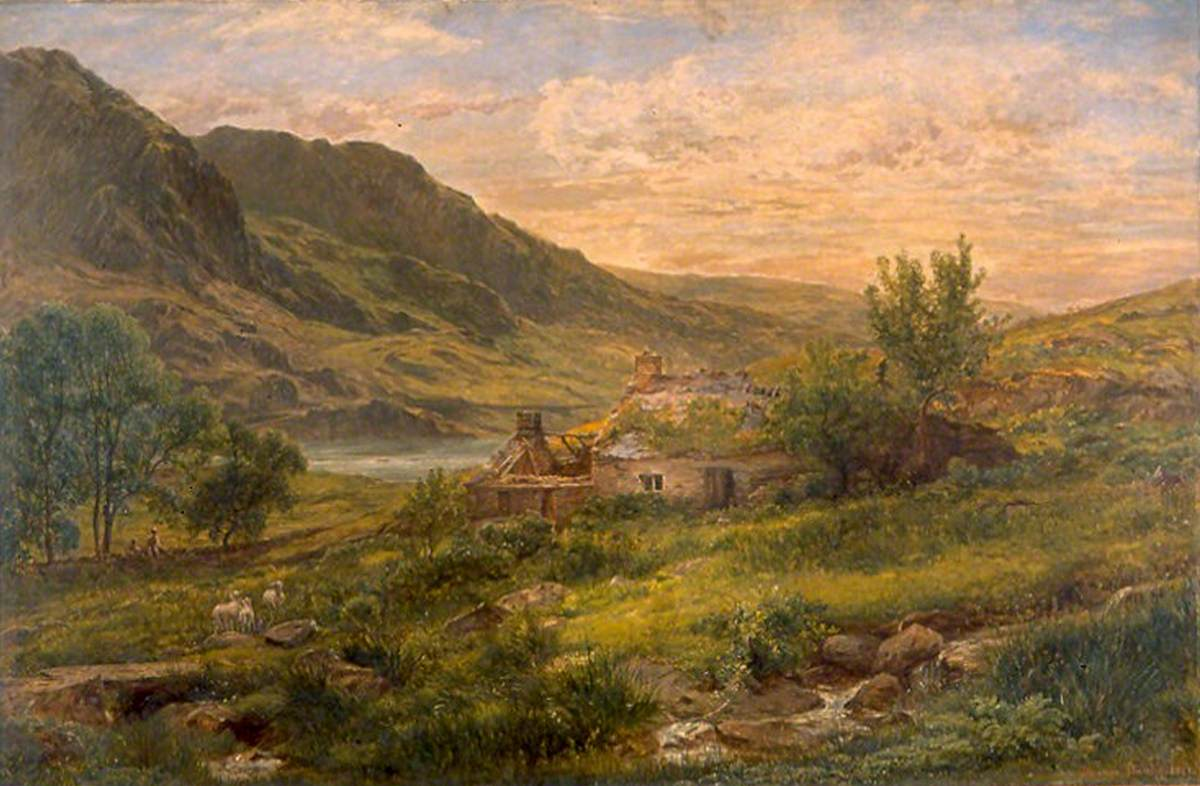
A Deserted Home by Thomas Danby

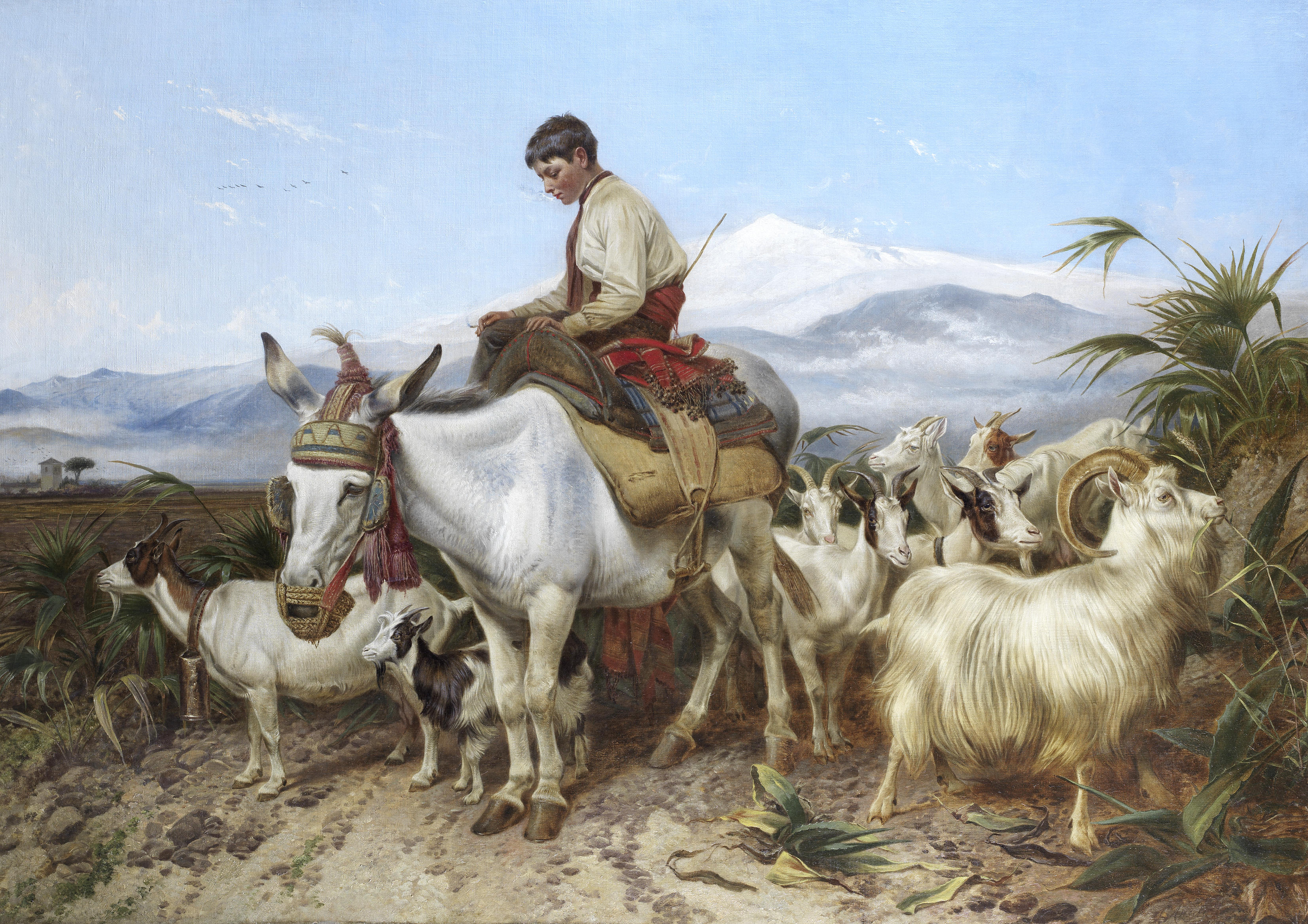
The Vega of Granada Returning from Pastures by Richard Ansdell

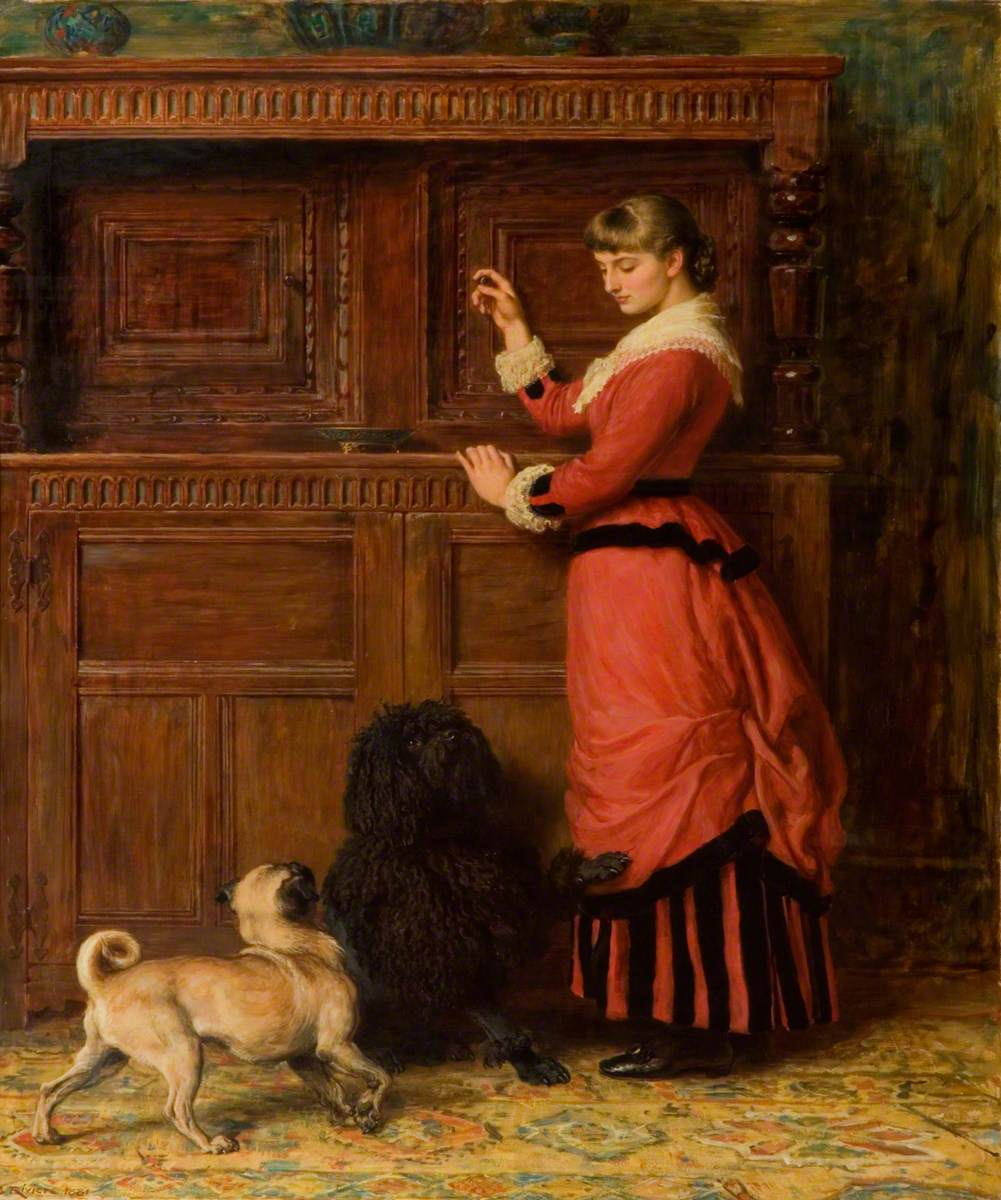
Cupboard Love by Briton Riviere

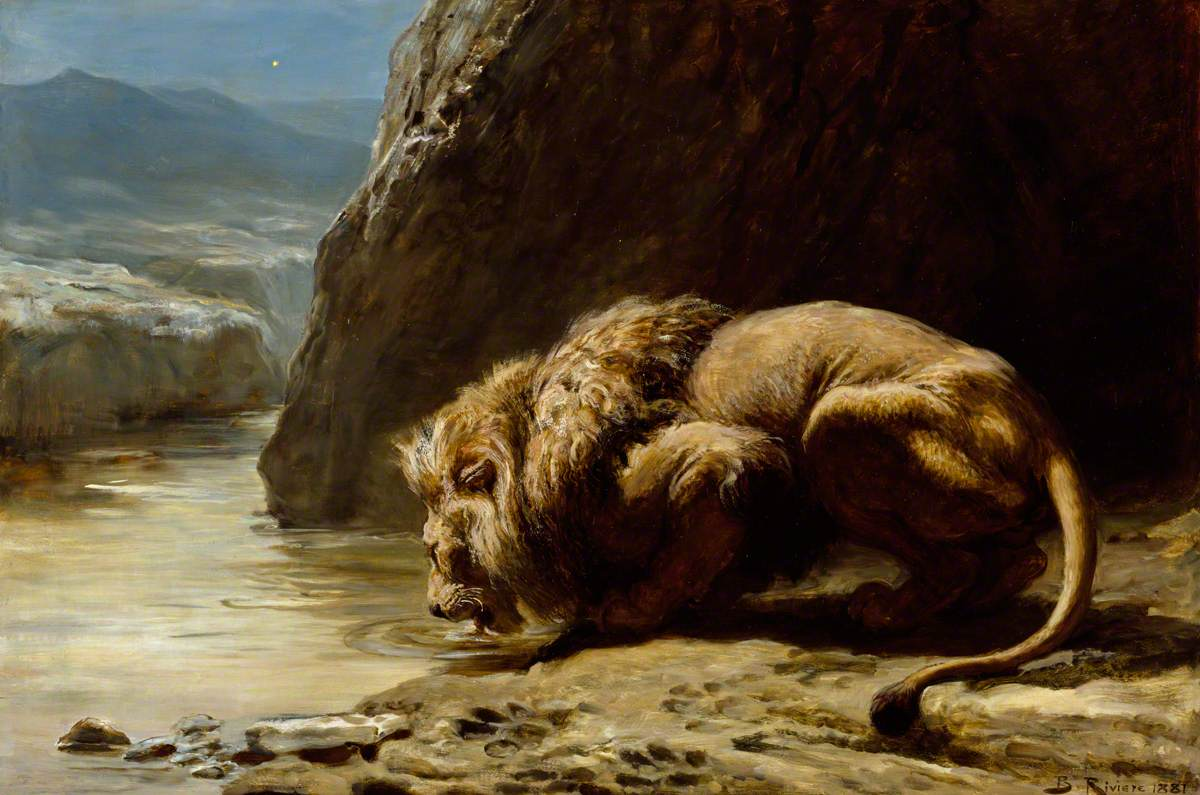
The King Drinks by Briton Riviere

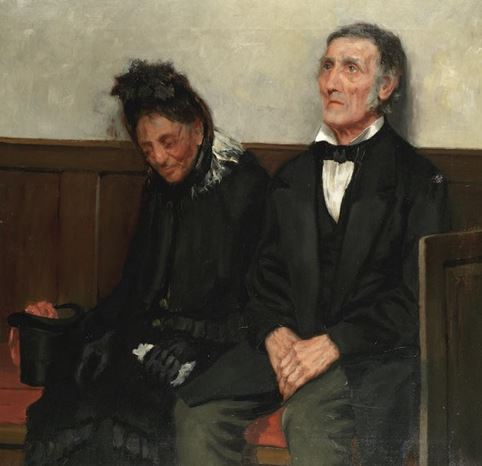
Darby and Joan by James Charles

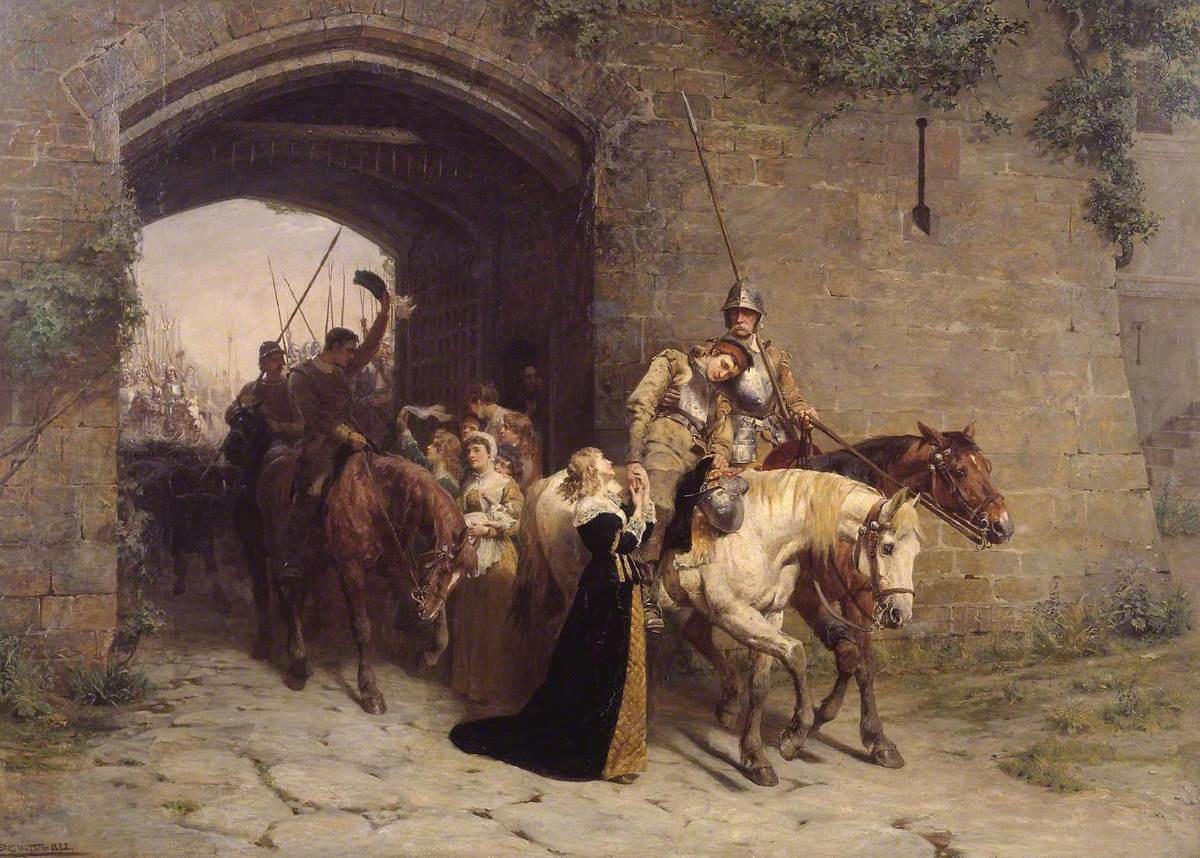
Sweethearts and Wives by Samuel Edmund Waller

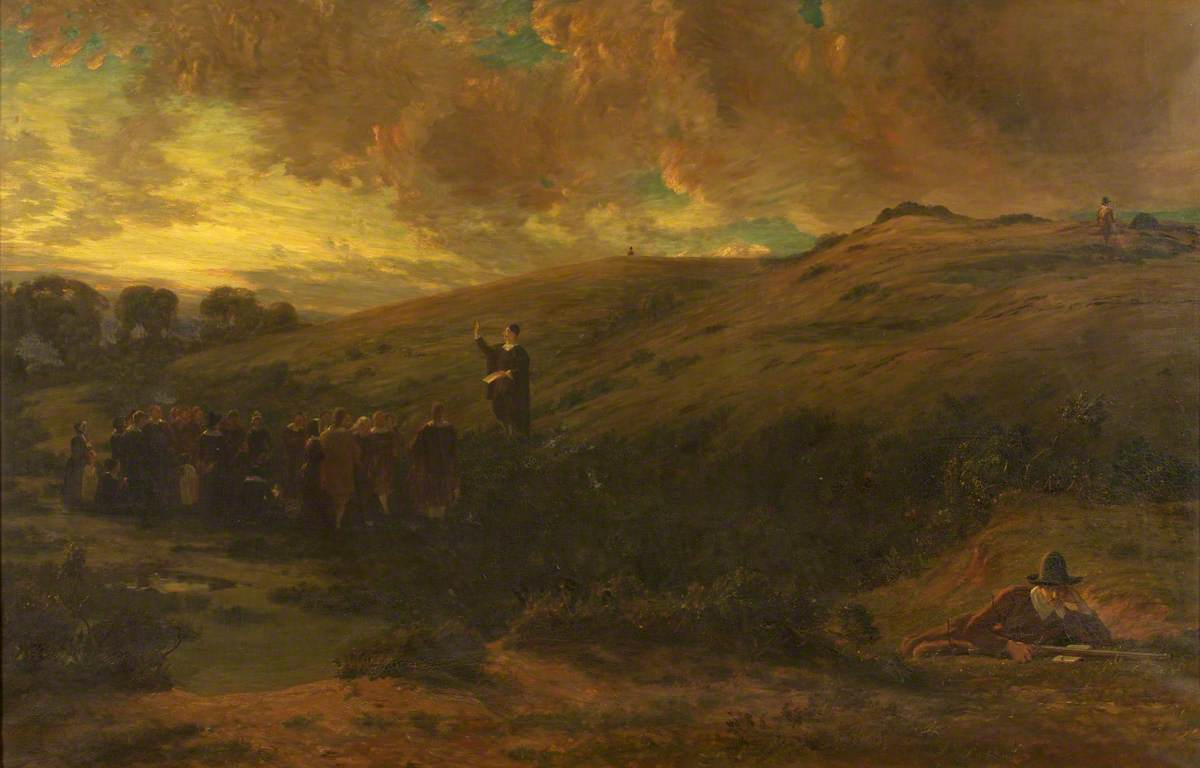
Persecuted, But Not Forsaken by Walter Field

How Happy Could I Be with Either by Eyre Crowe

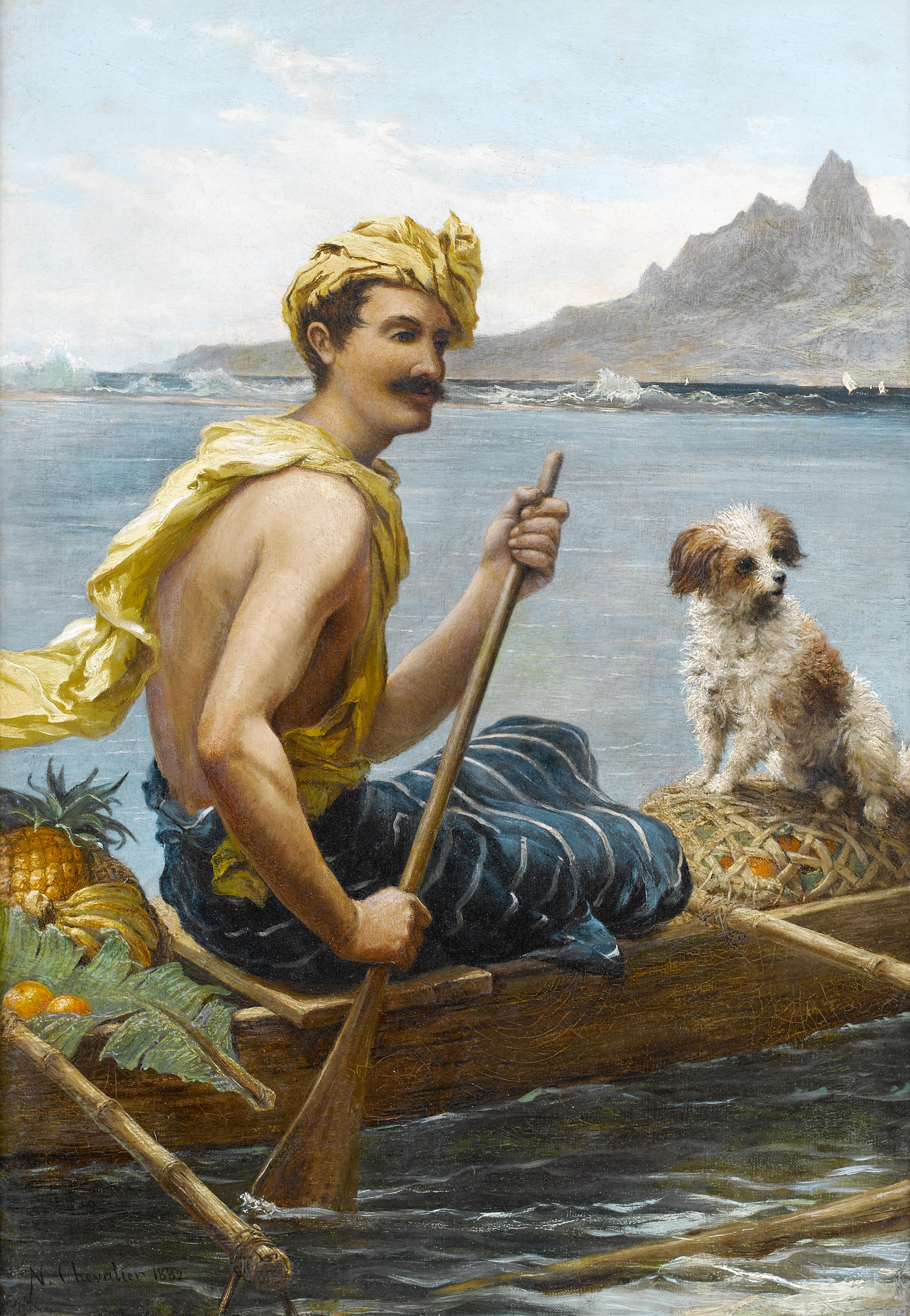
Arcadia, South Sea Islands by Nicholas Chevalier

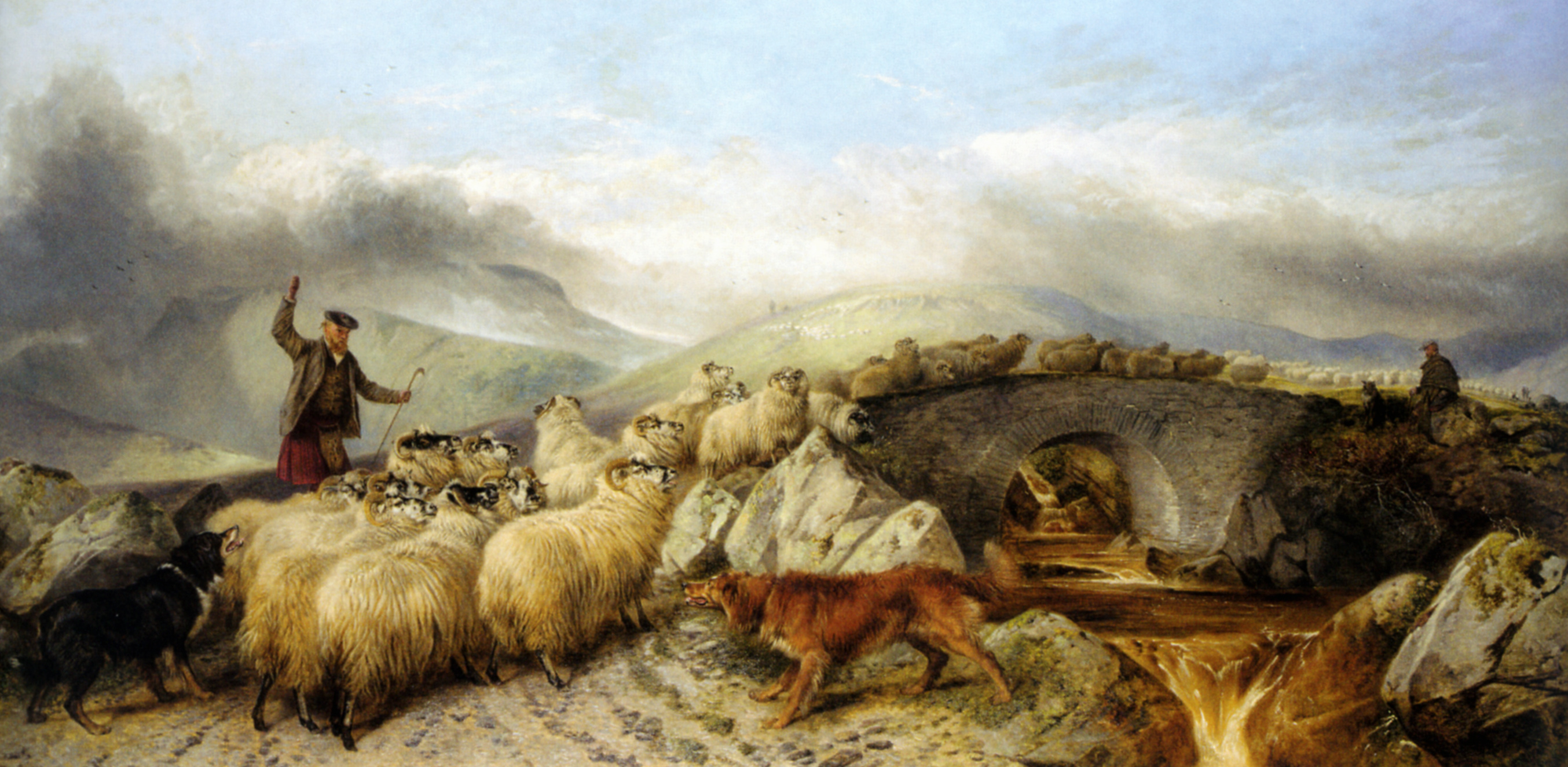
Collecting the Sheep for Clipping in the Highlands by Richard Ansdell

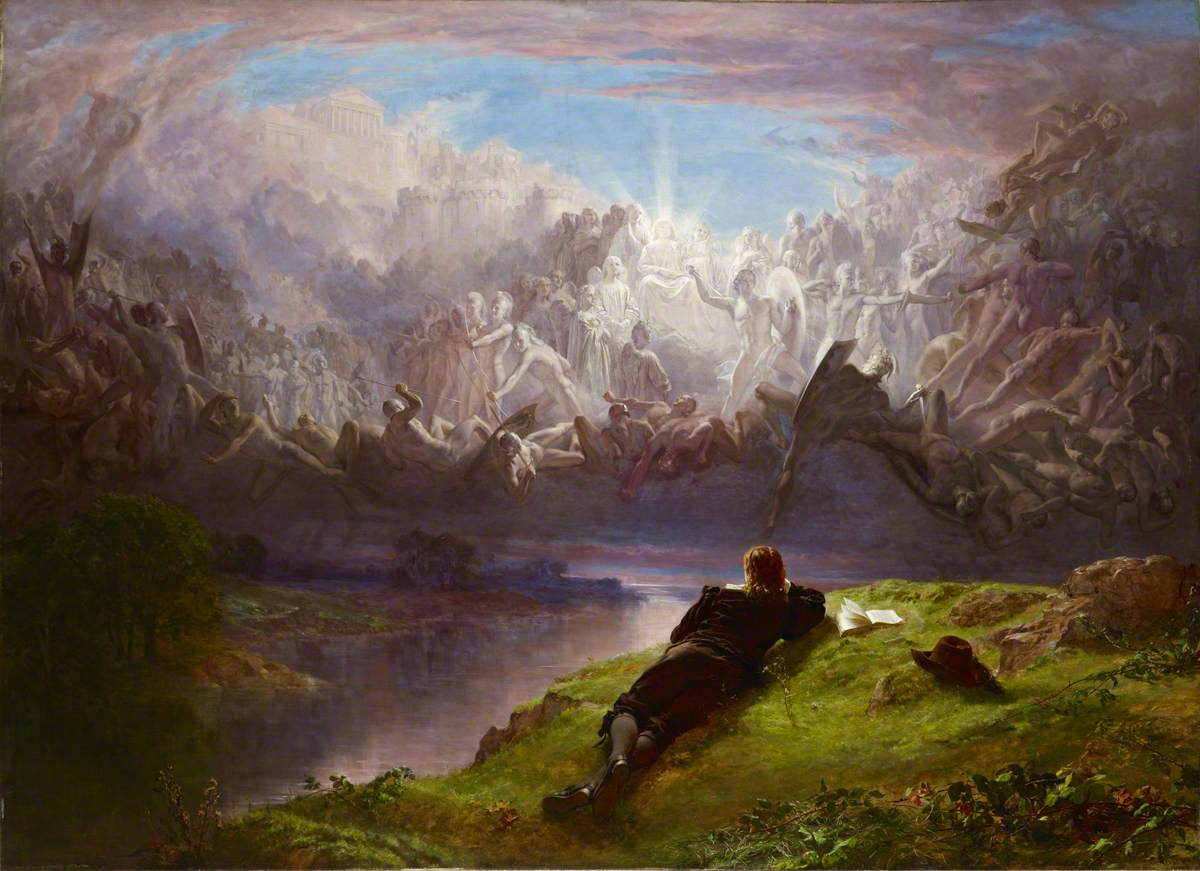
The Poet's Dream by John Faed

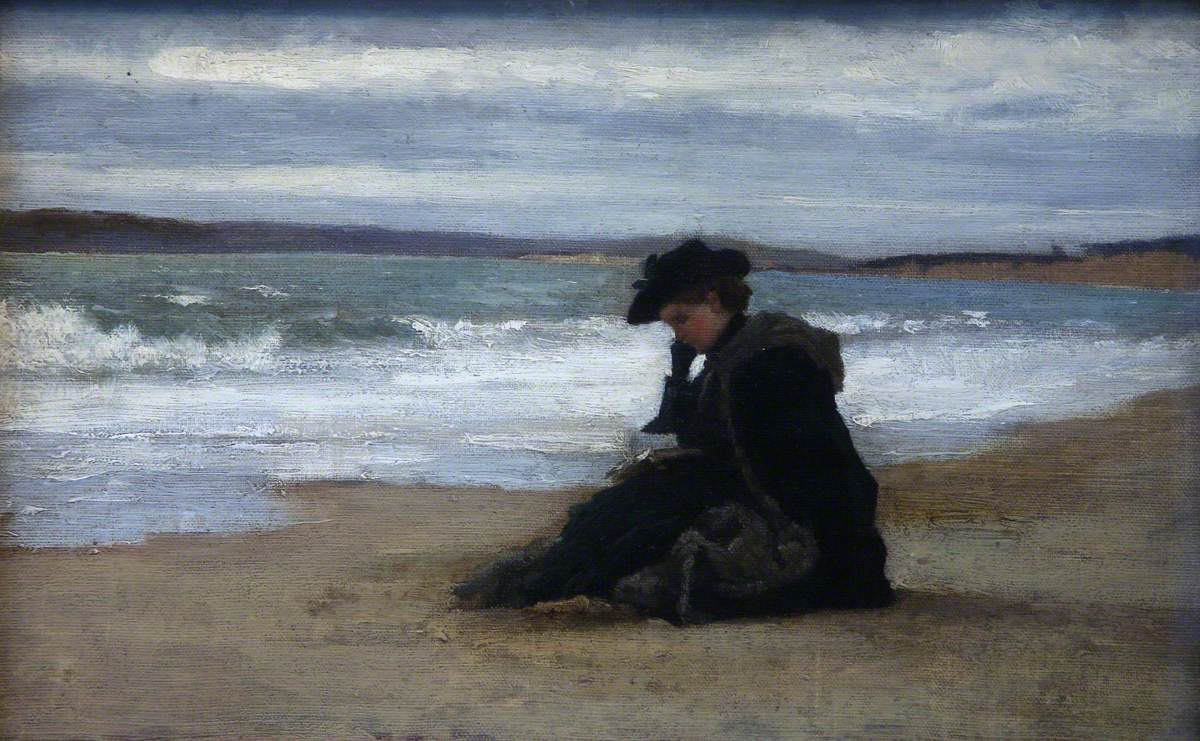
On the Beach, Bournemouth by Henry Scott Tuke

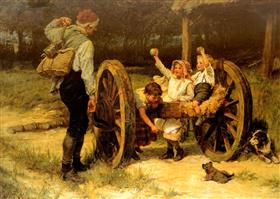
Merry As The Day Is Long by Frederick Morgan

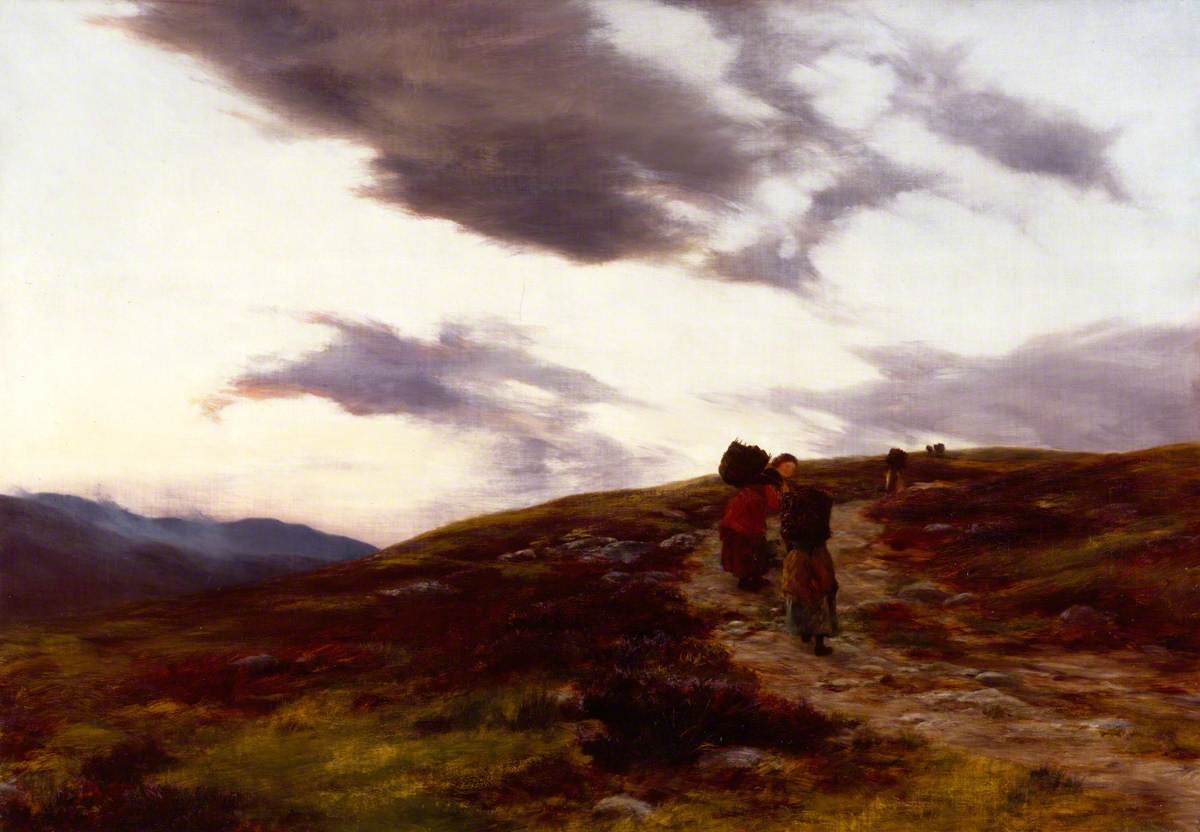
Homewards by Peter Graham

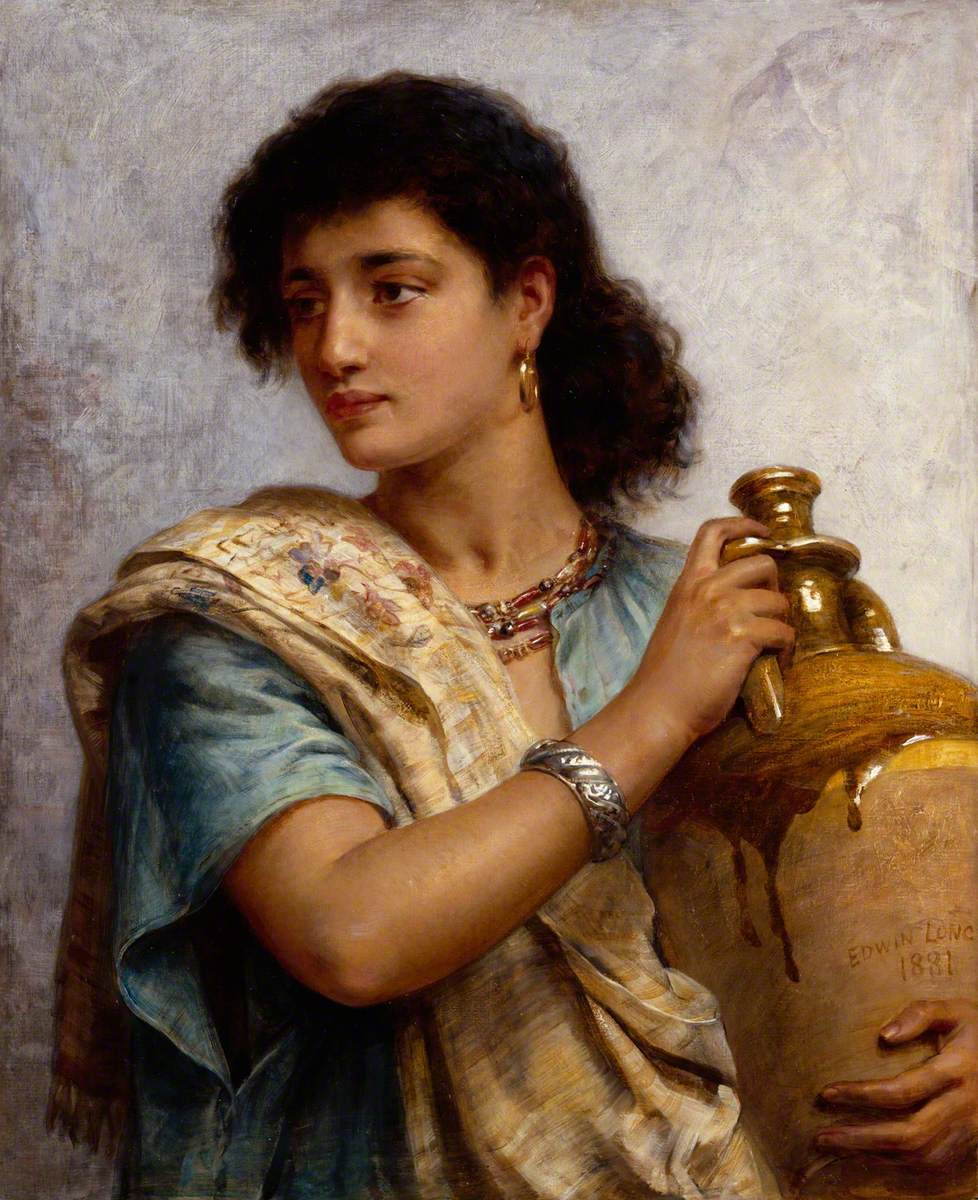
Nouzhatoul-aouadat by Edwin Long

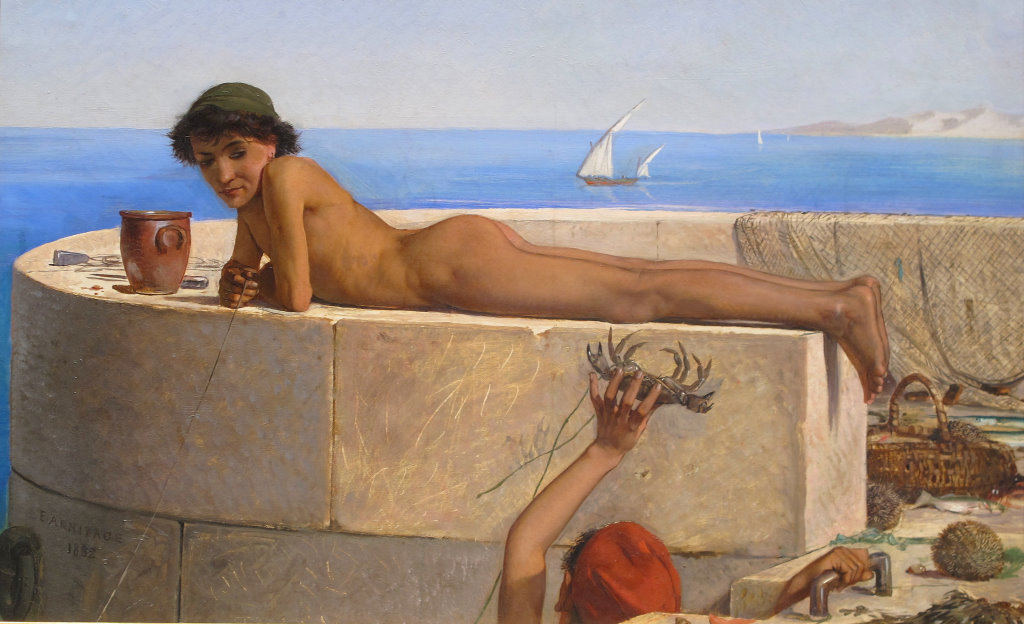
Sea Urchins by Edward Armitage

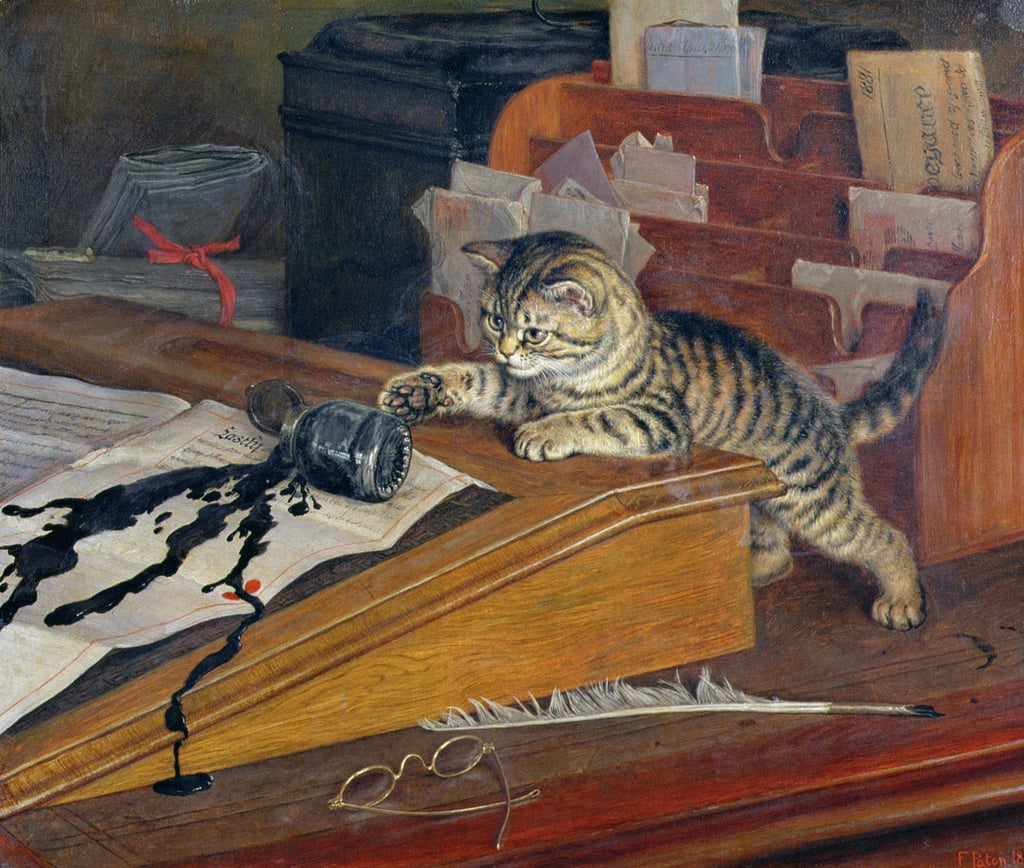
Witness my Act and Deed by Frank Paton

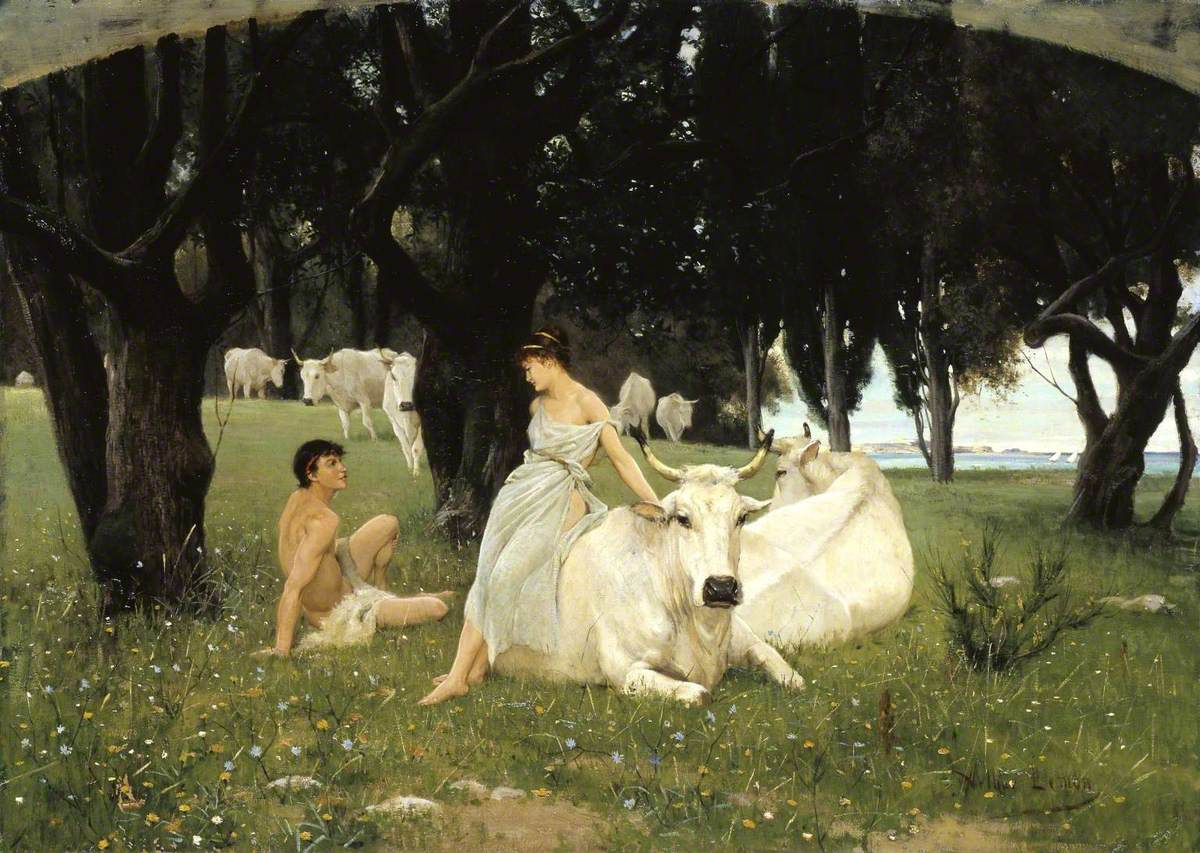
The Wooing of Daphnis by Arthur Lemon

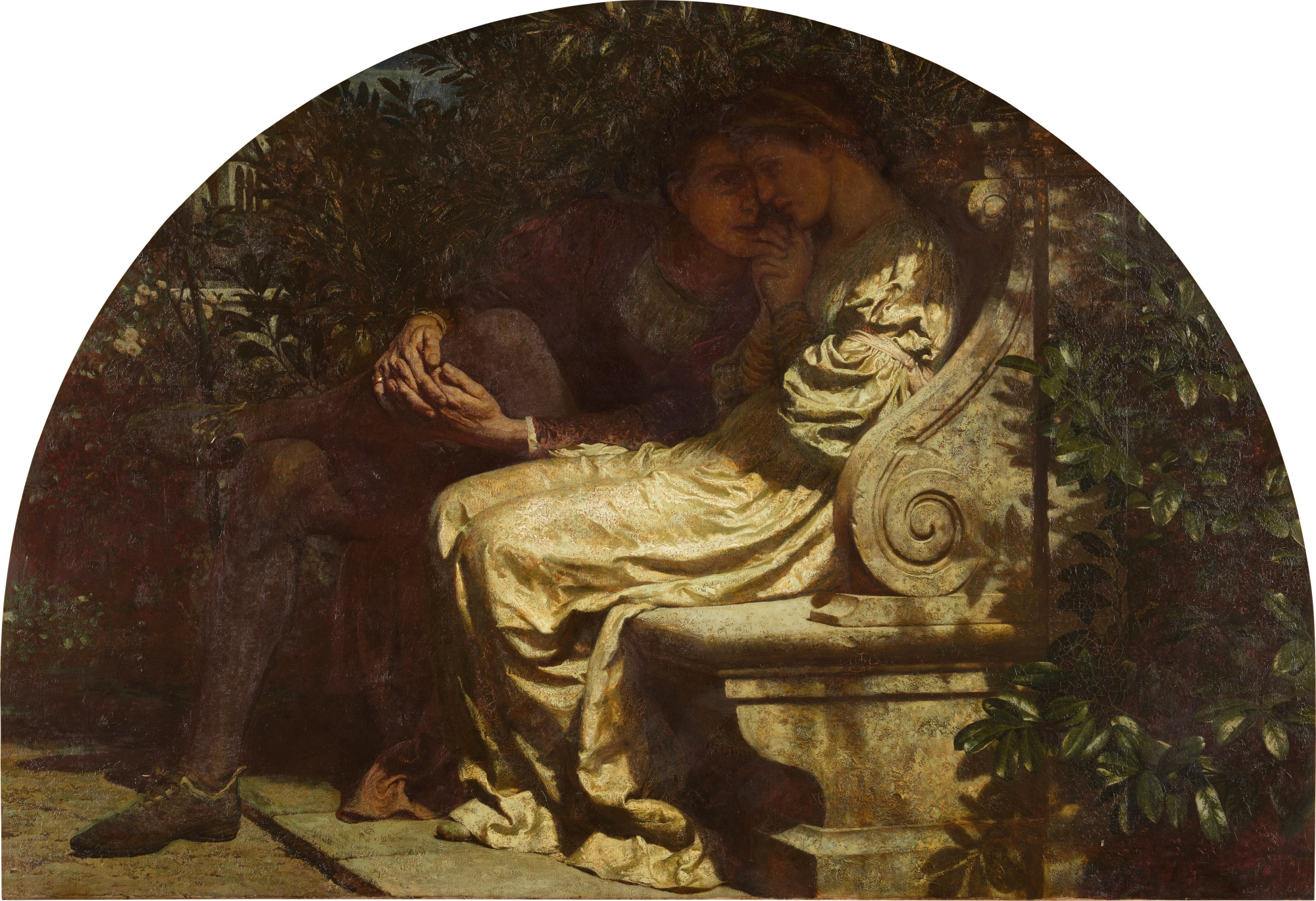
A Love Story by Frank Dicksee

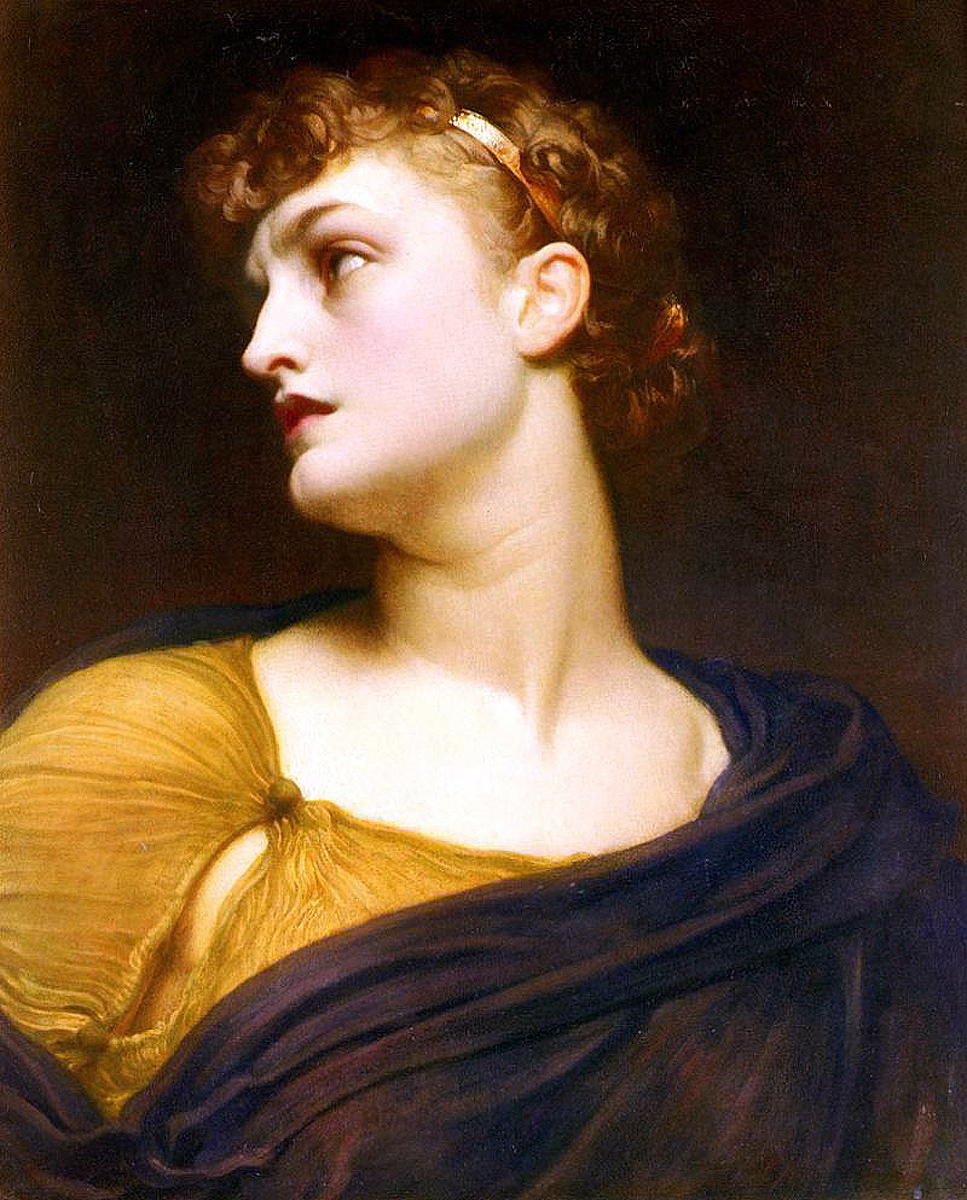
Antigone by Frederic Leighton

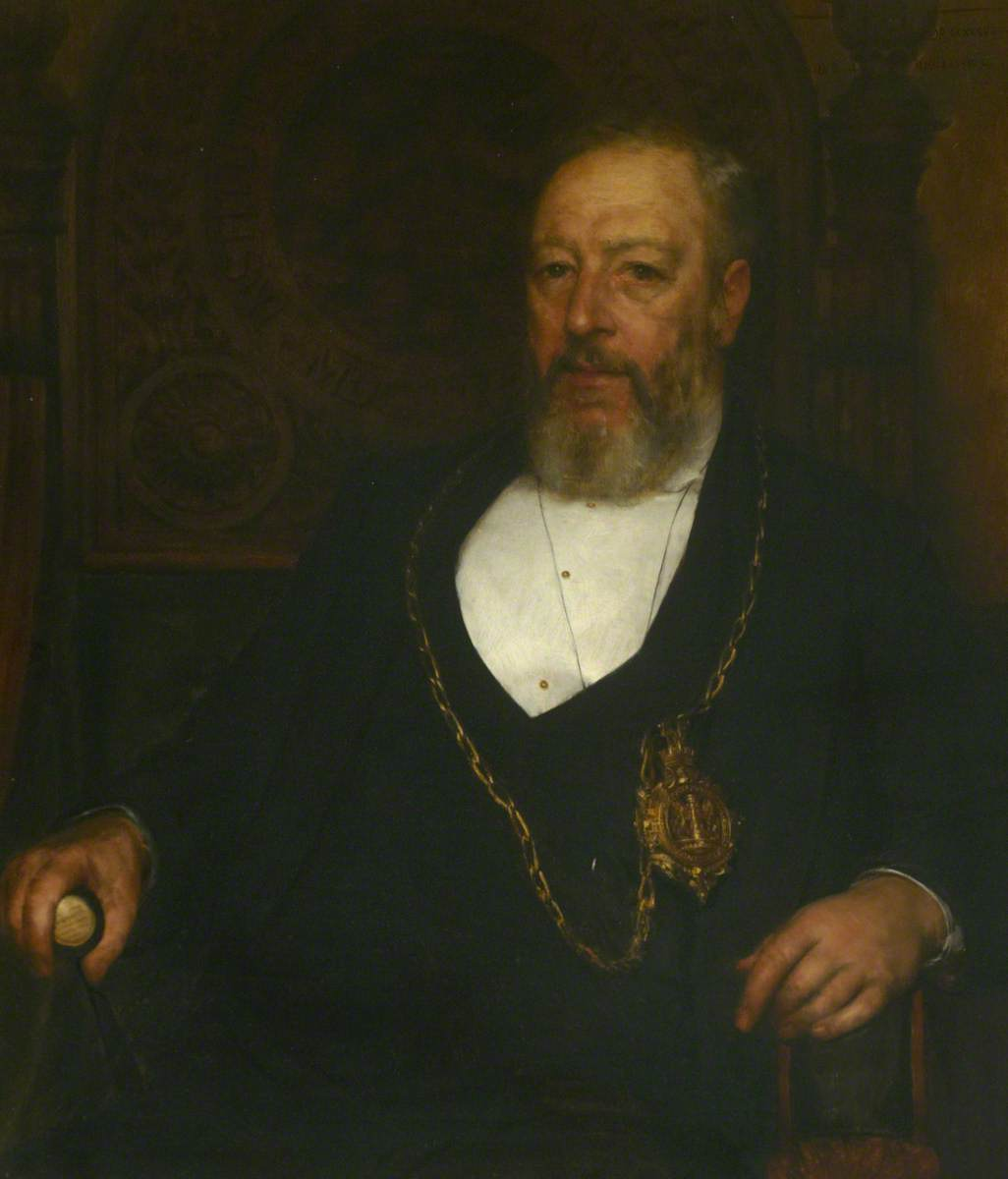
Portrait of John Whichcord by Lawrence Alma-Tadema

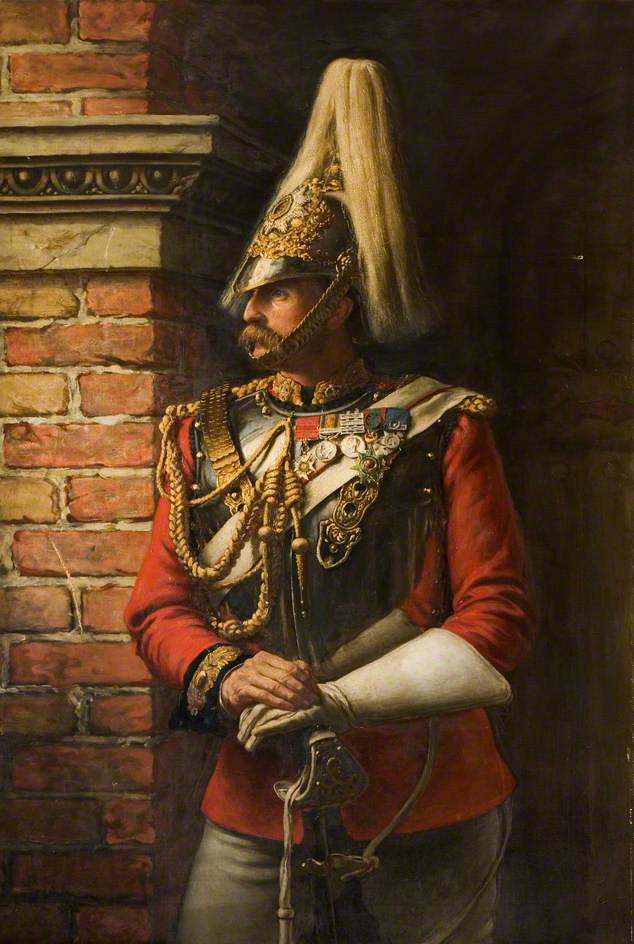
Portrait of Reginald Talbot by Archibald Stuart-Wortley

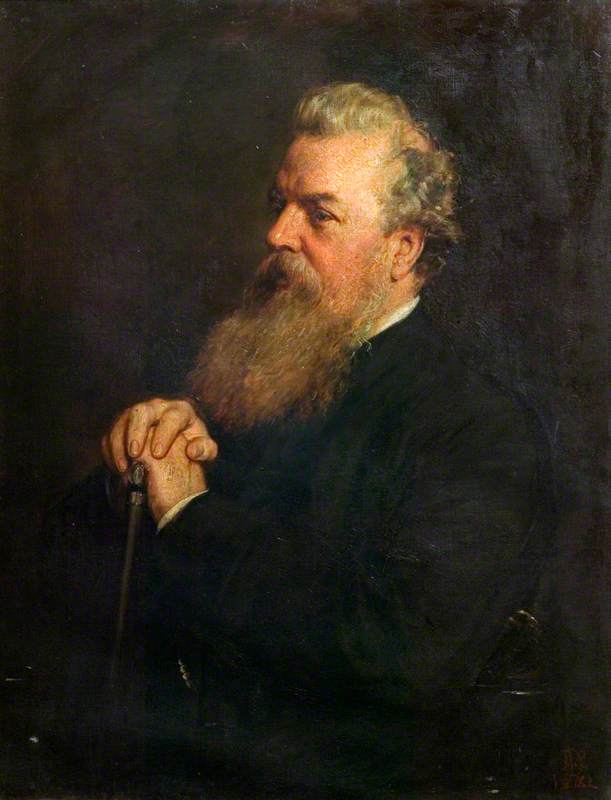
Portrait of Septimus Hansard by Lowes Cato Dickinson

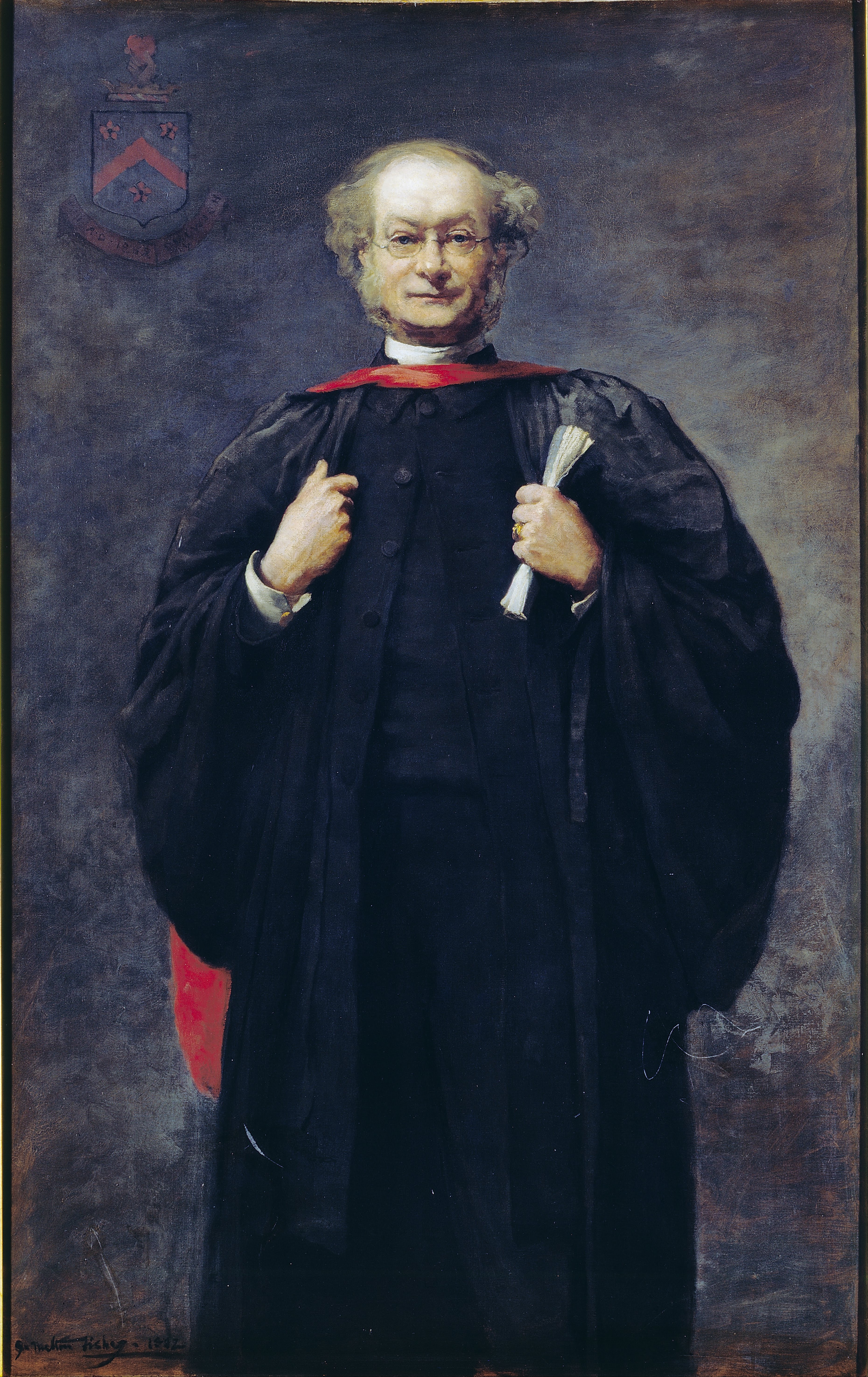
Portrait of Alfred J. Carver by Samuel Melton Fisher

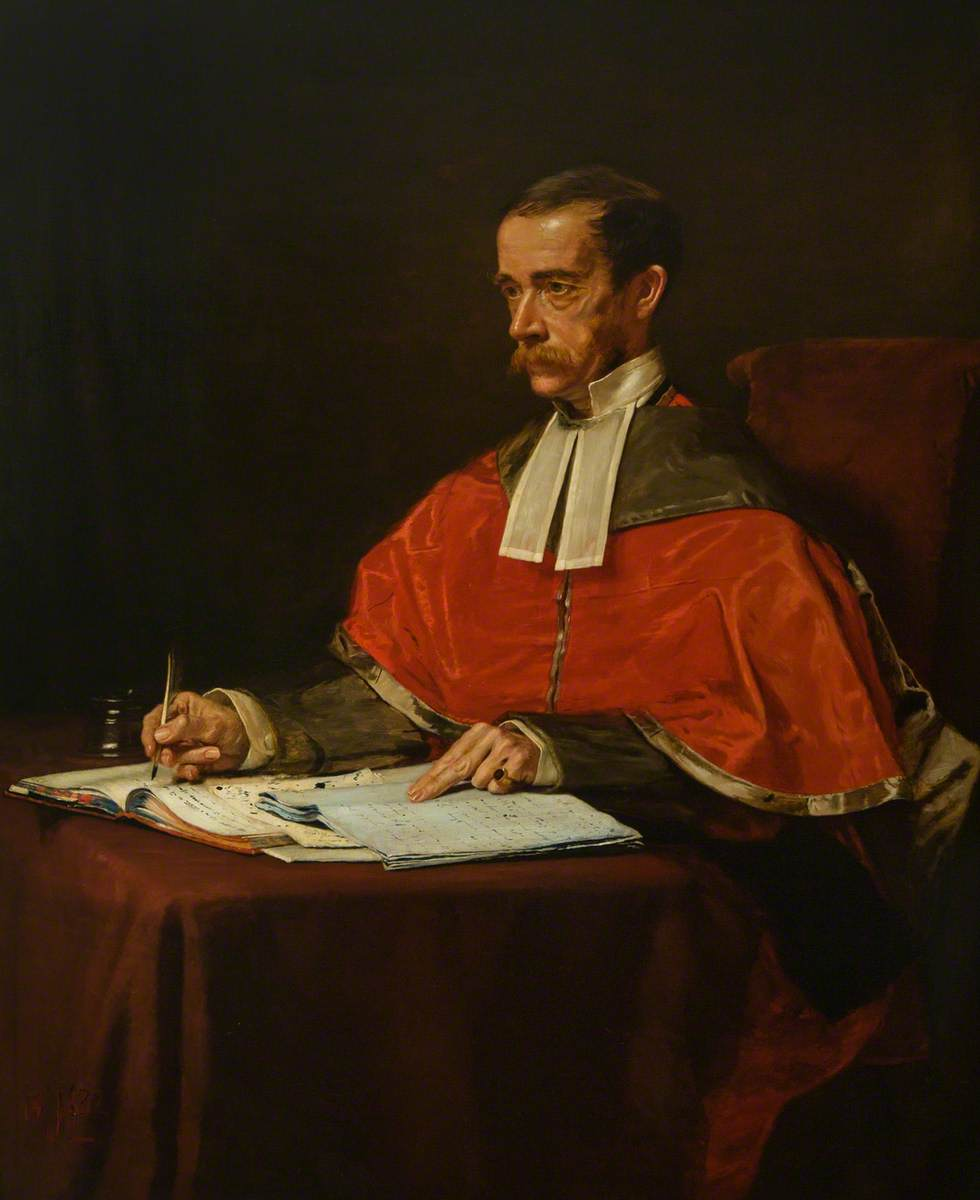
Portrait of David Chalmers by John Henry Lorimer

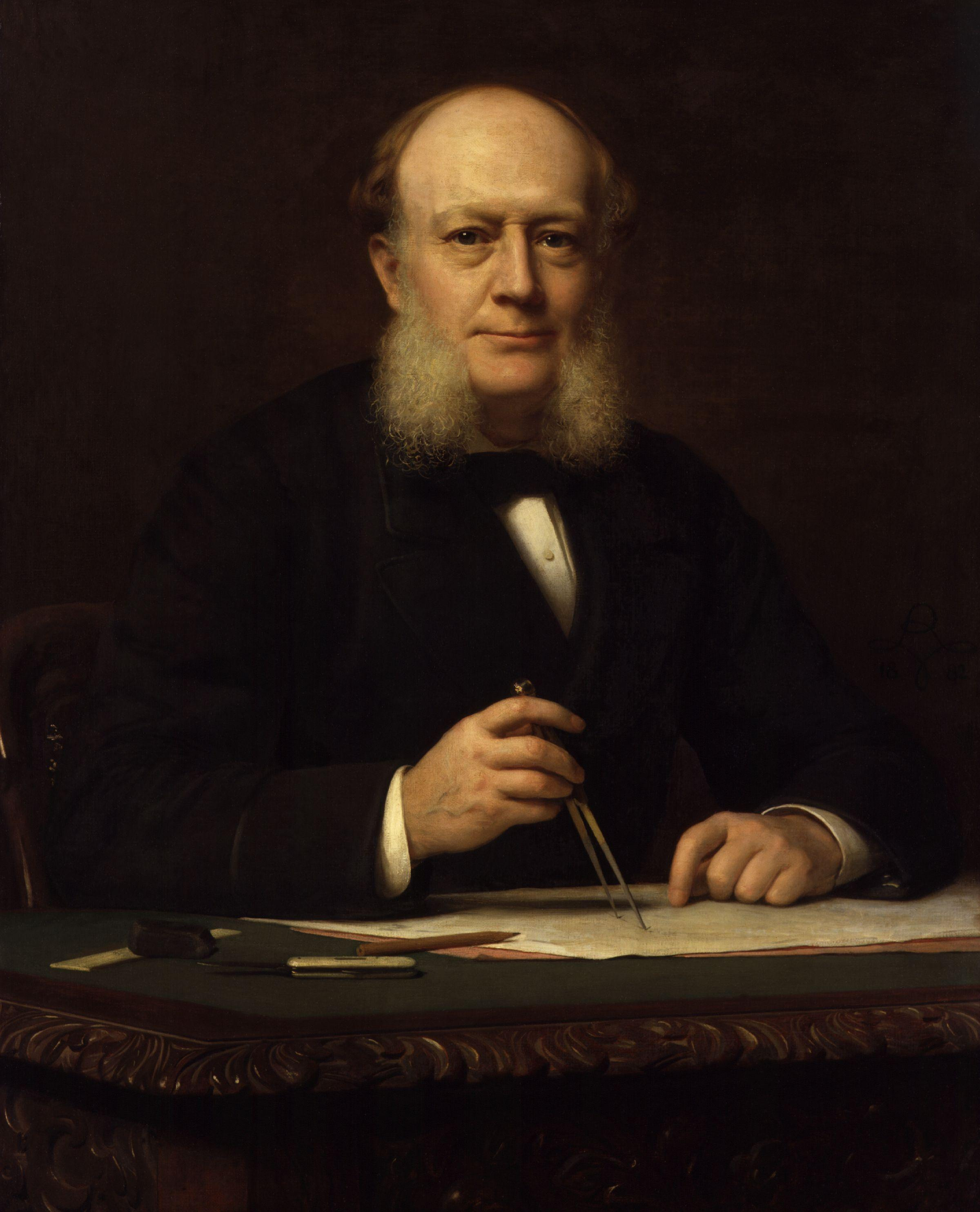
Portrait of Carl Wilhelm Siemens by Rudolf Lehmann

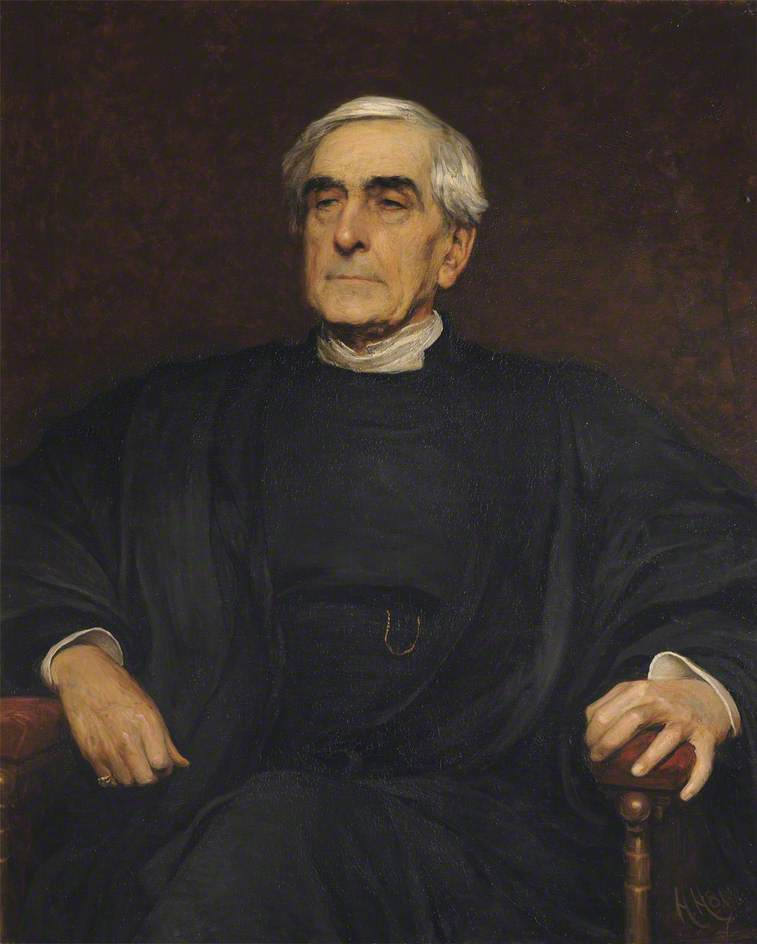
Portrait of William Hepworth Thompson by Hubert von Herkomer

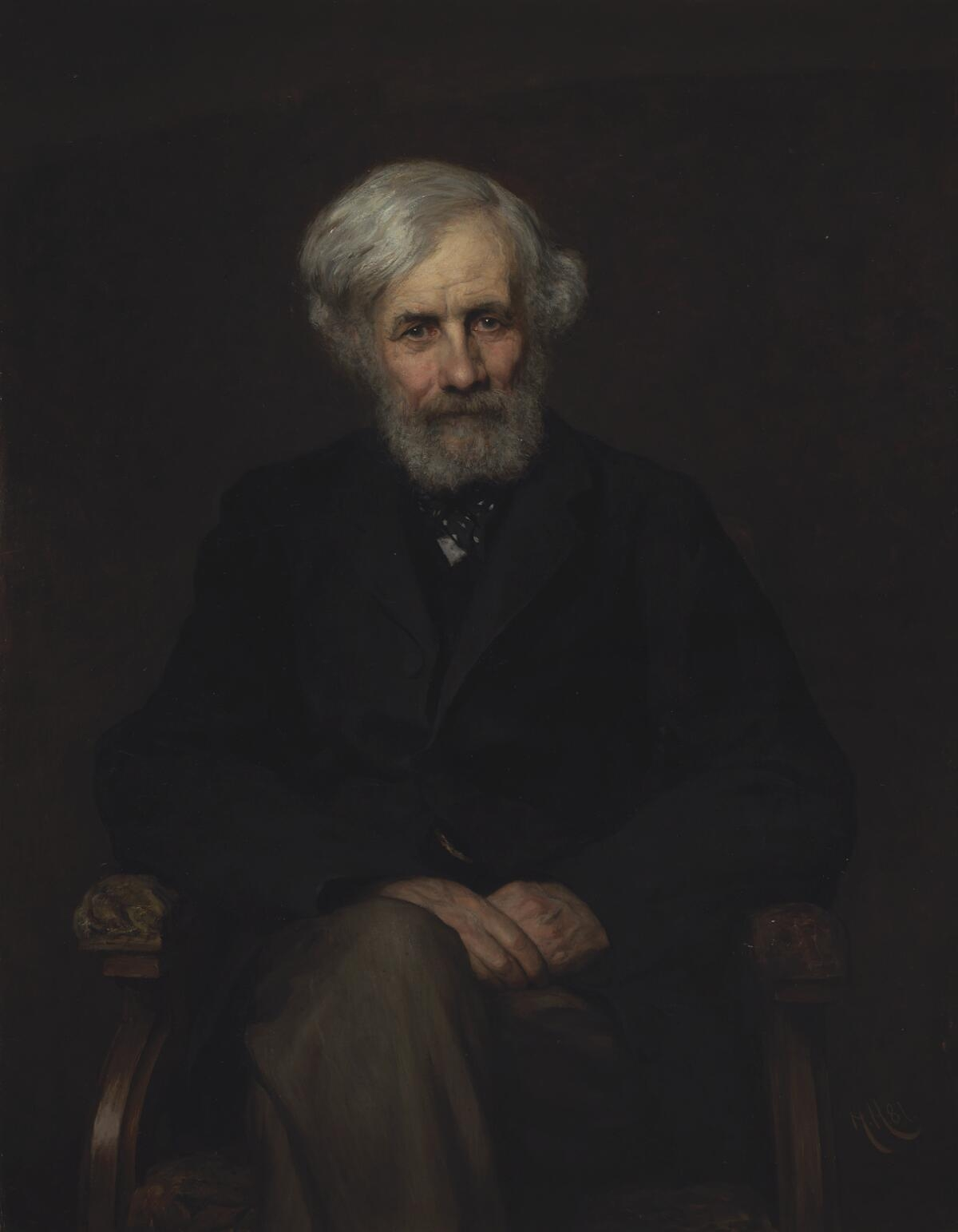
Portrait of Brownlow Wynne Wynne by Hubert von Herkomer

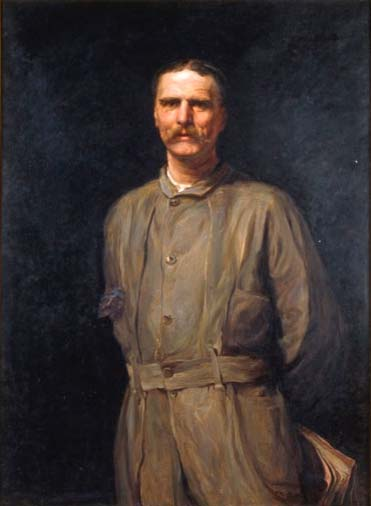
Portrait of Archibald Forbes by Hubert von Herkomer

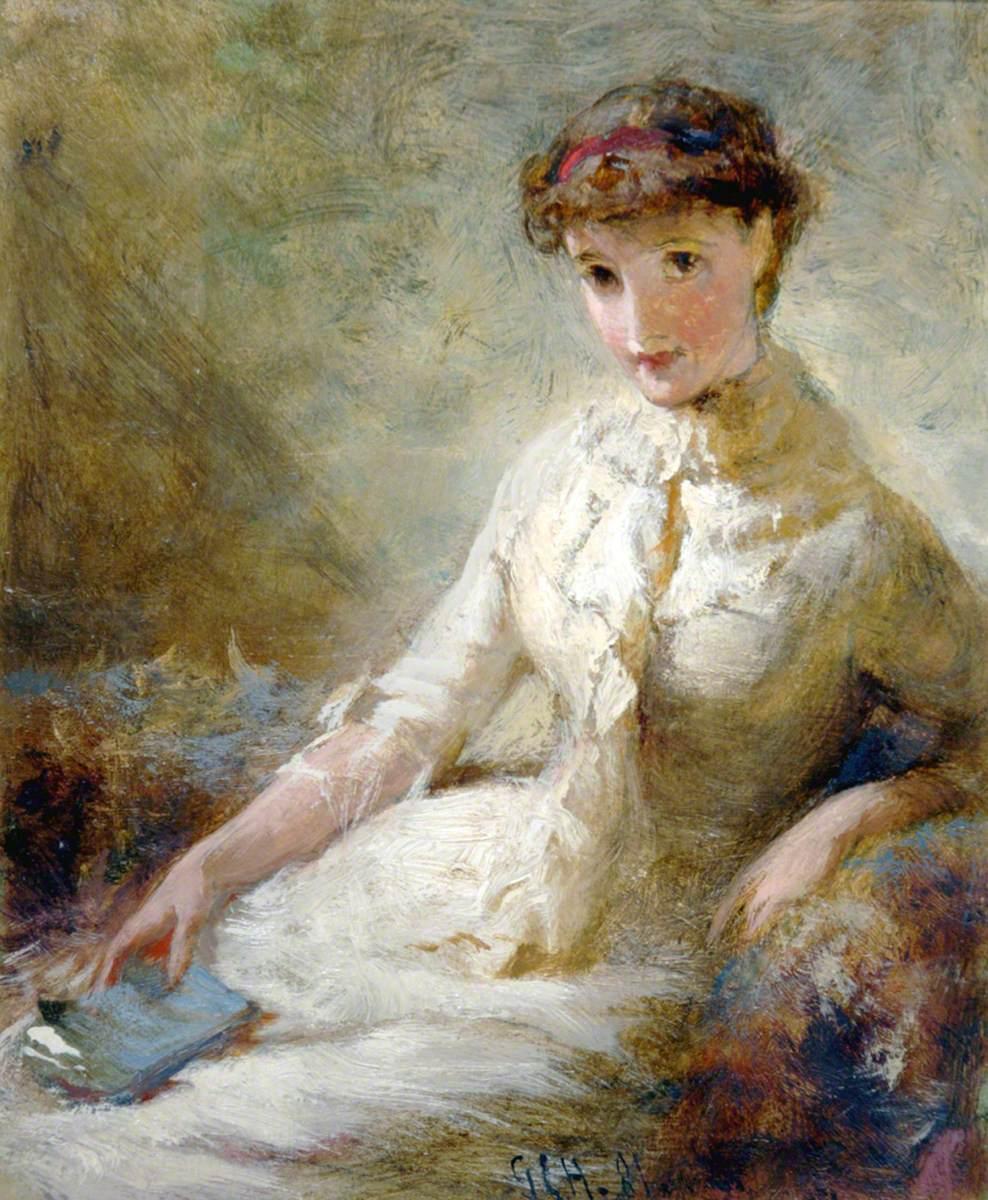
Mrs Park Yates by George Elgar Hicks

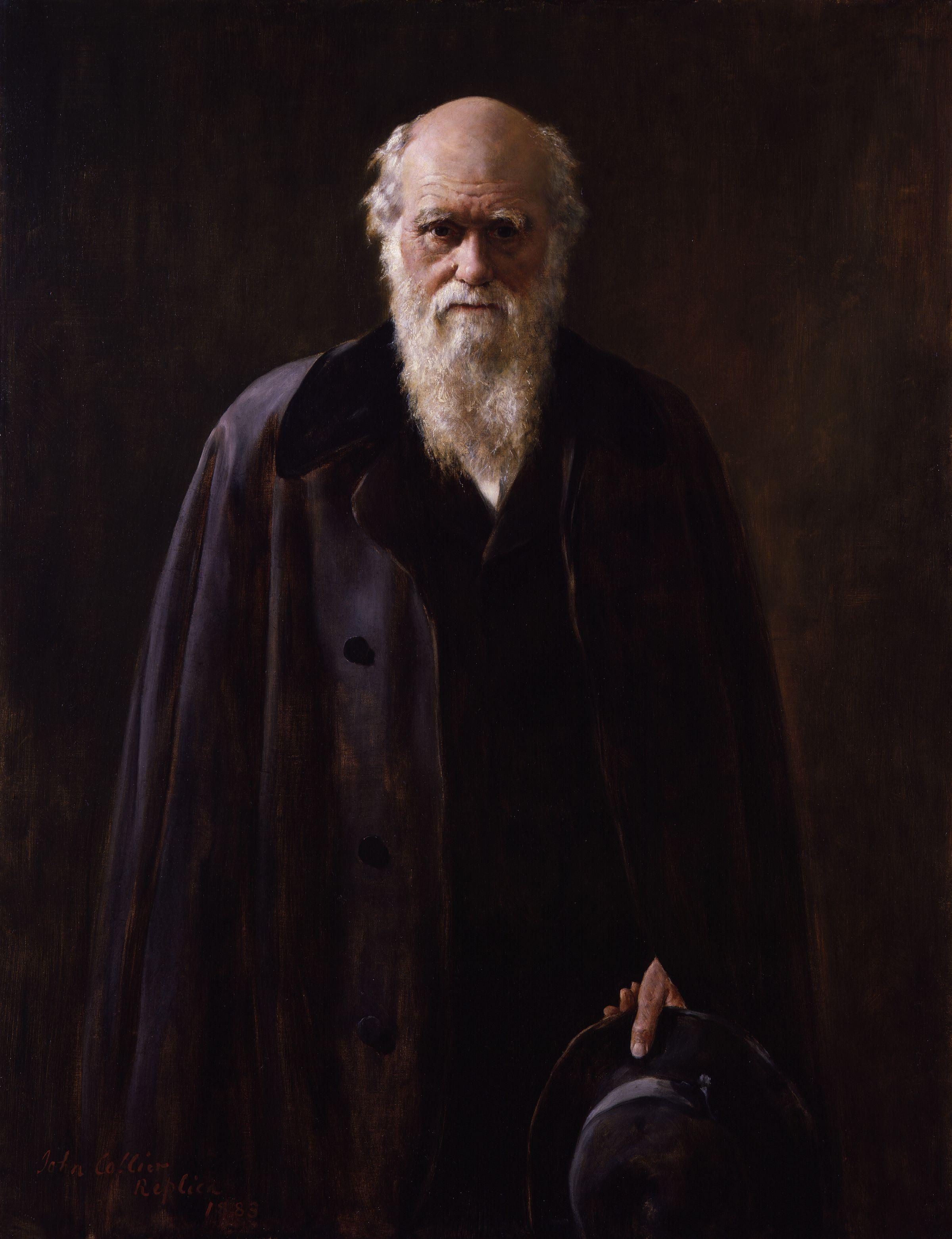
Portrait of Charles Darwin by John Collier

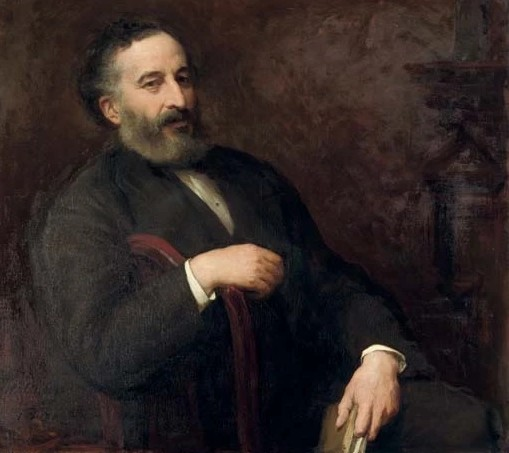
Portrait of Stephen Augustus Ralli by Walter William Ouless

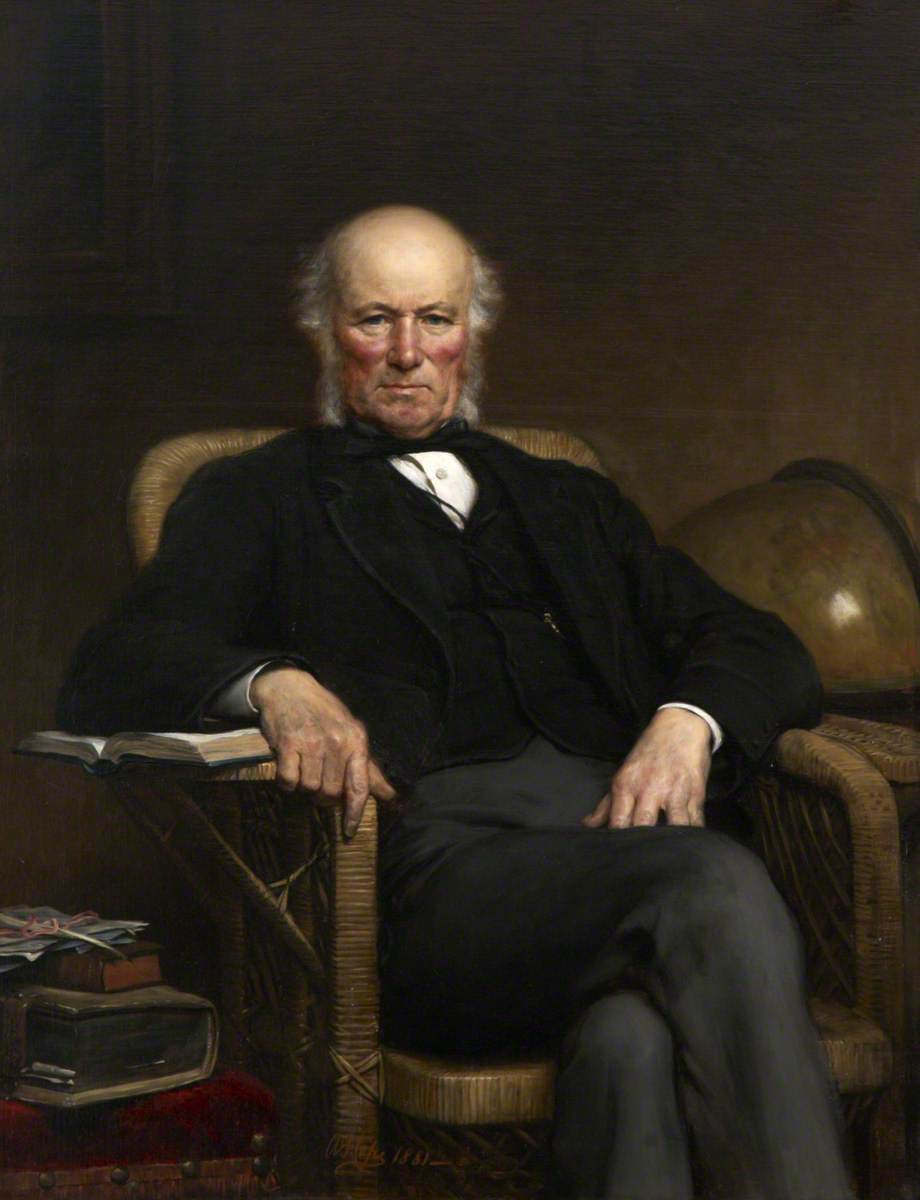
Portrait of William Pengelly by Arthur Stockdale Cope

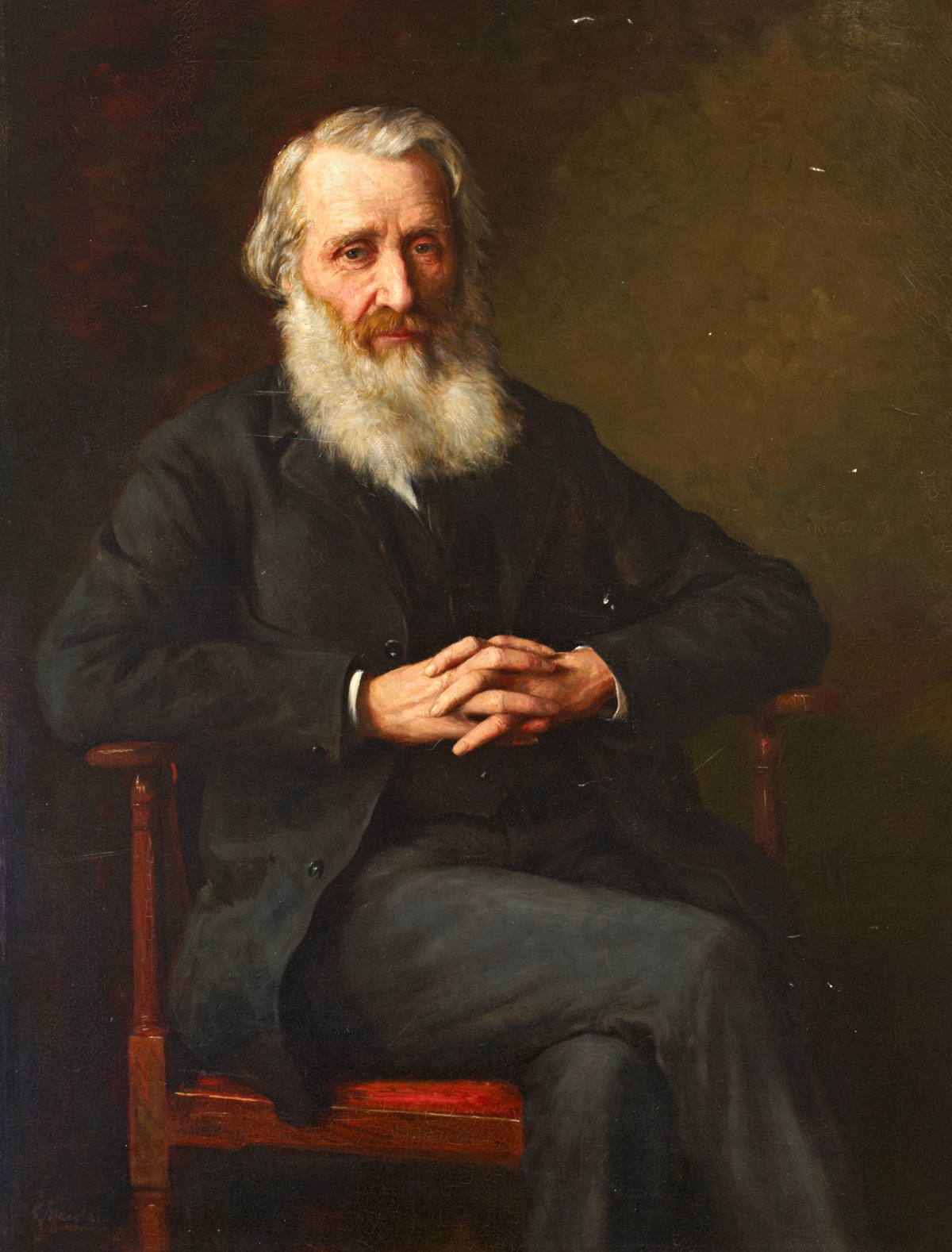
Portrait of John Tomes by Carlile Henry Hayes Macartney

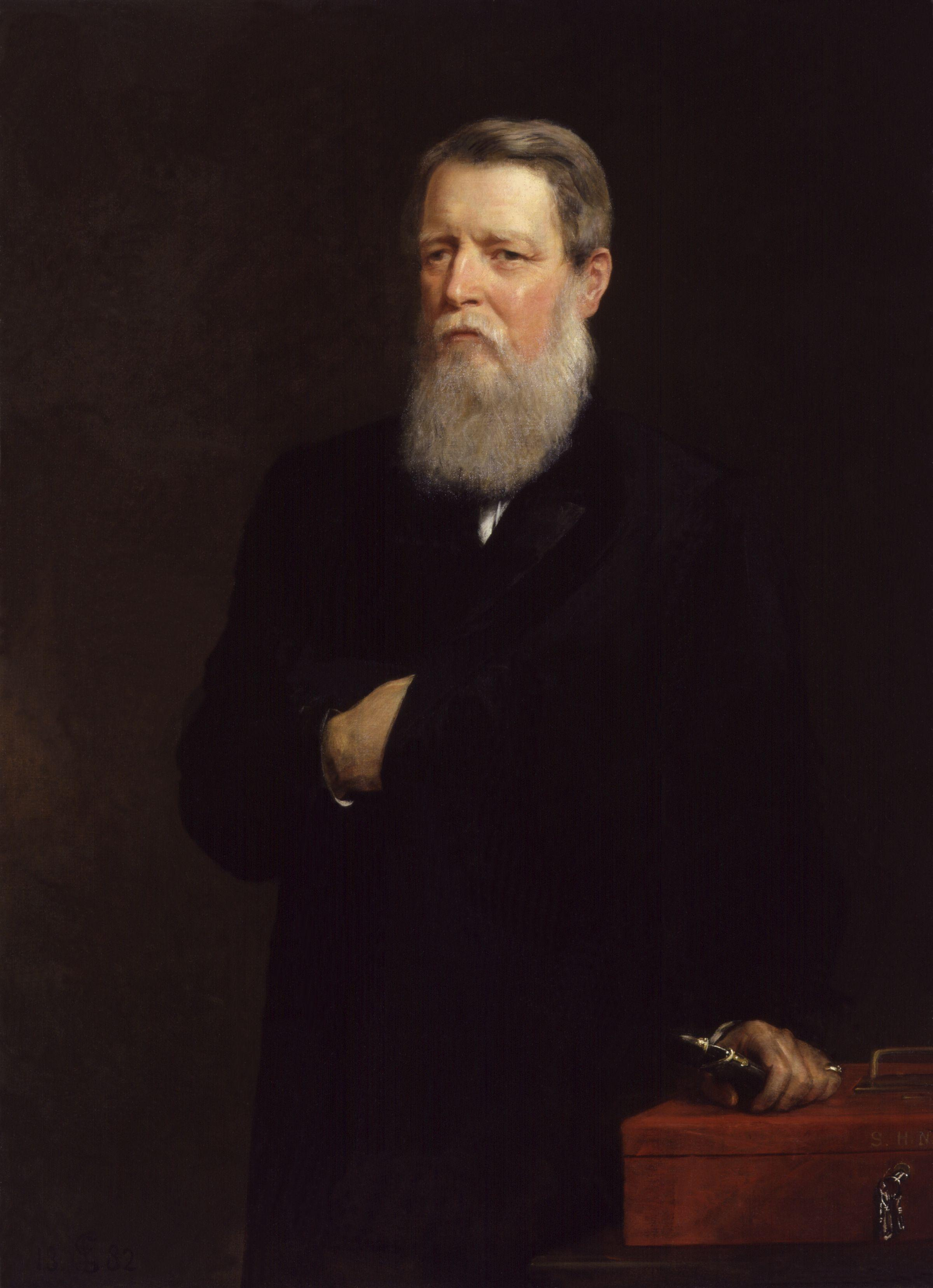
Portrait of Stafford Northcote by Edwin Long

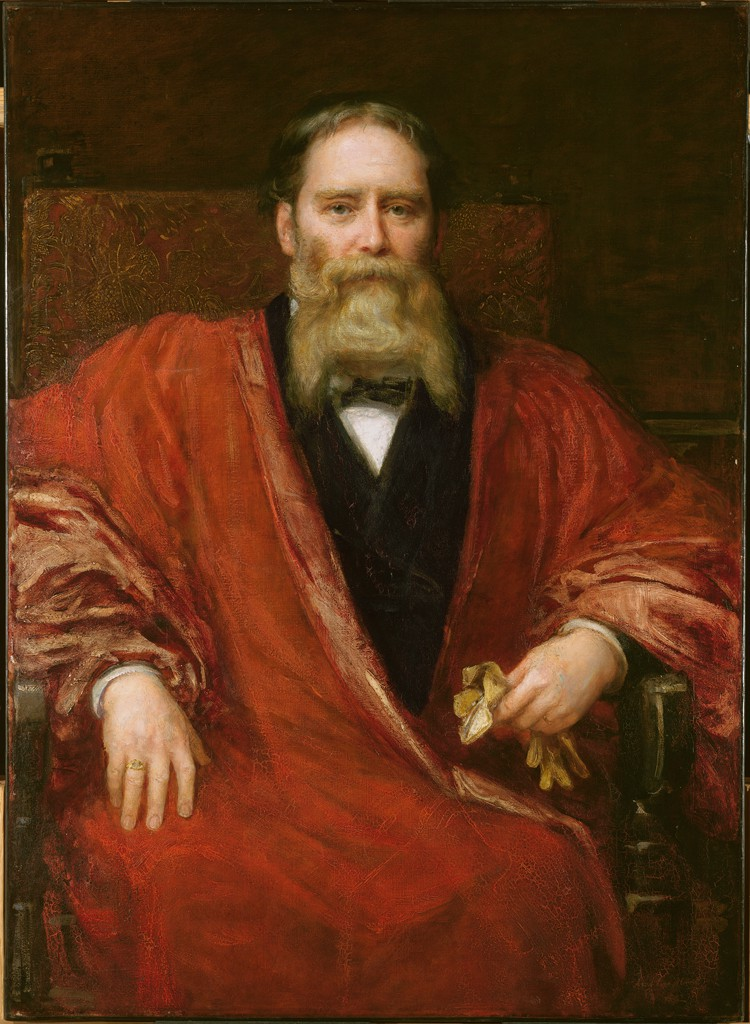
Portrait of James Russell Lowell by Anna Lea Merritt

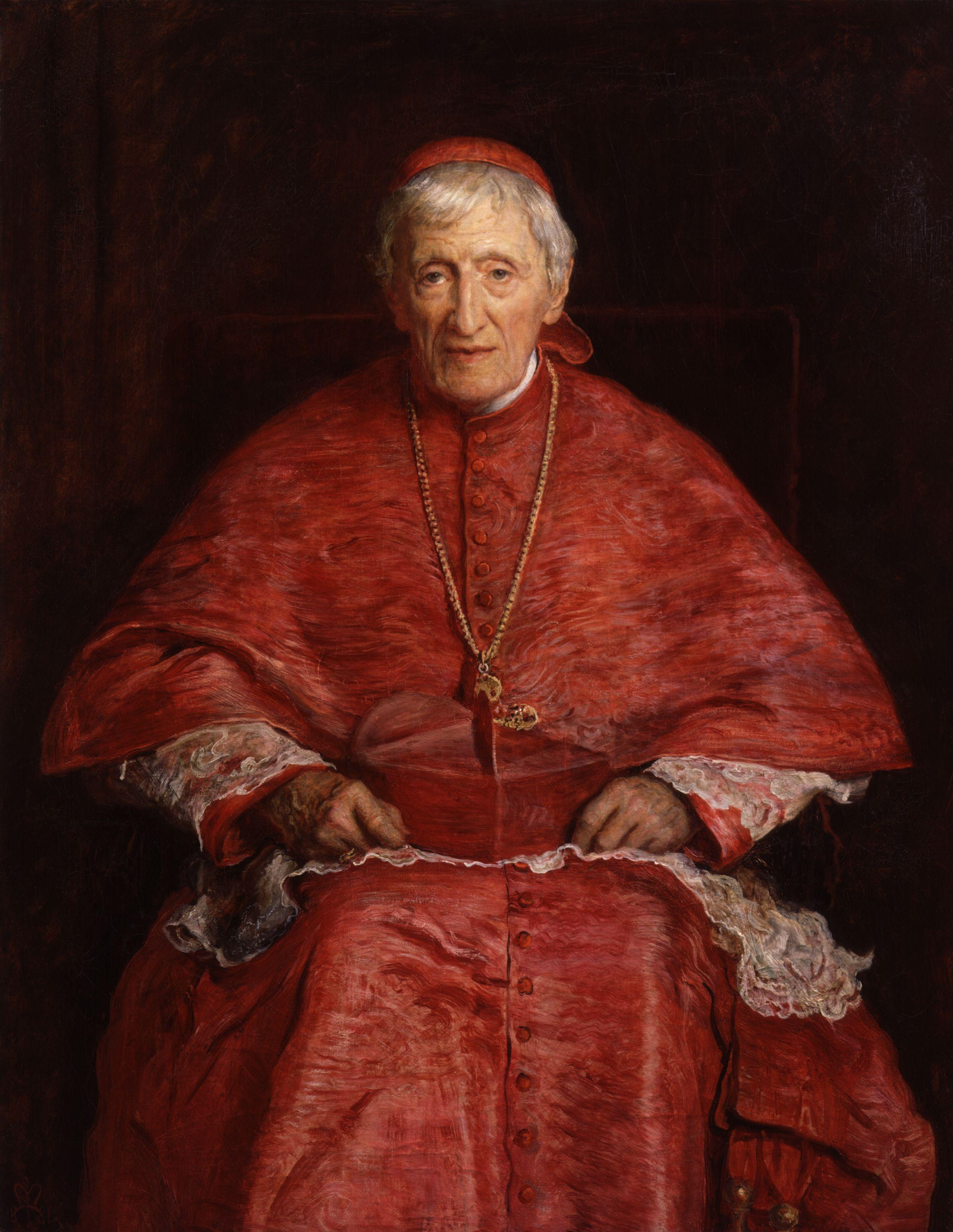
Portrait of Cardinal Newman by John Everett Millais

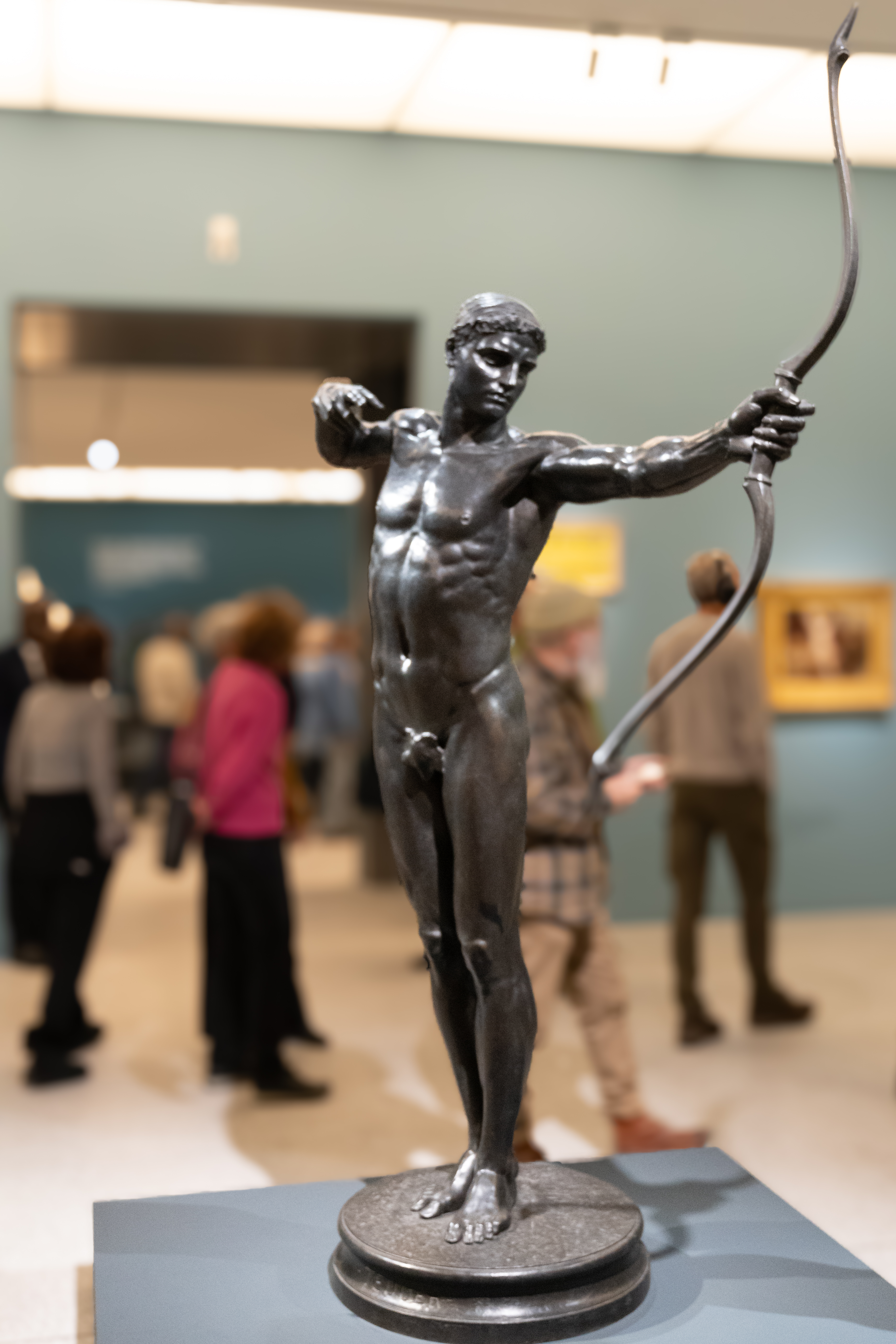
Teucer by Hamo Thornycroft

== Bibliography ==
- Mitchell, Claudine. Rodin: The Zola of Sculpture. Taylor & Francis, 2017.
- Tinterow, Gary. Manet/Velázquez: The French Taste for Spanish Painting. Metropolitan Museum of Art, 2003.

== See also ==
- Salon of 1882, held at the Palace of Industry in Paris
