= Trans-Mississippi Issue =

Set of commemorative stamps issued to mark the 1898 Trans-Mississippi Exposition

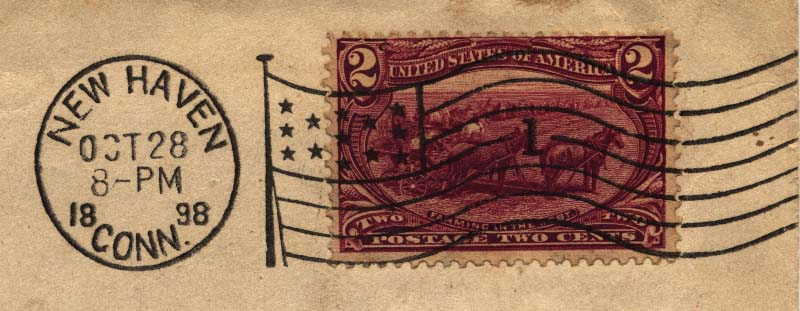
Flag cancel used on a 2¢ Trans-Miss

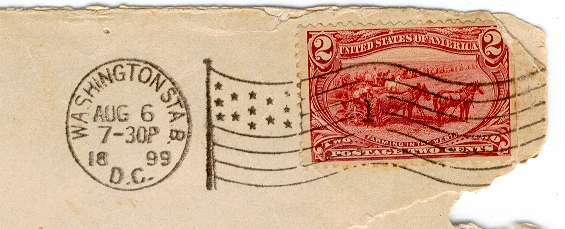
Farming in the West" with cancellation stamp from D.C.

The Trans-Mississippi Issue is a set of nine commemorative postage stamps issued by the United States to mark the 1898 Trans-Mississippi Exposition held in Omaha, Nebraska. The finely engraved stamps depict various scenes of the West and are presently valued much by collectors. This was only the second commemorative issue offered by the U.S. Post Office and closely followed the pattern of its predecessor, the Columbian Exposition series of 1893: both sets appeared in conjunction with important international world's fairs; both offered a wide range of stamp denominations; both adopted the double-width stamp format to accommodate pictorial tableaux.

An important factor in the creation of this series was that the Director of Publicity for the Exposition—Edward Rosewater, publisher of the Omaha Daily Bee—was something of an expert in stamps. Rosewater, nationally prominent in Republican politics, had been selected by President McKinley to preside over the U.S. delegatation at the 1897 Congress of the Universal Postal Union (the international convention responsible for securing efficiency in the flow of mail from country to country, tasked that year with securing cheaper international postage). On December 13, 1897, Rosewater suggested that the Post Office issue special stamps commemorating the Trans-Mississippi Exposition (as it had for the Columbian Exposition), and 10 days later Postmaster General James A. Gary agreed, promising a series with five denominations ranging from one cent to one dollar. Gary asked Rosewater for his ideas about stamp subjects, and the latter, in response sent handsome wash drawings on tracing paper for the five values: 1¢, bison herd (dusky orange); 2¢, Indian on horseback (deep orange-red); 5¢, ploughman and plough horse (dark yellow); 10¢, train rounding a steep mountain pass (dusky blue); $1, torchbearing goddess (Columbia) perched upon a globe (deep orange yellow). These stamps would have been of the large Columbian size but rotated in orientation, with the short sides at the top and bottom. (The U.S. would not issue a "vertical commemorative" of this sort until 1926, when the Erickson Memorial appeared.)

Gary's announcement of the series prompted protests from stamp collectors, who were still unhappy about the high price of the Columbian Issue of 1893 ($16.34, a princely sum at the time), but the Postmaster said he decided on the issue "because I wanted to help the people of the West." Indeed, Gary subsequently made the set even more expensive by adding four more stamps to the series, including a $2 denomination, raising its price to $3.80.

Design concepts solicited from various artists won out over Rosewater's suggestions; indeed, the officials of Bureau of Engraving and Printing deemed it imperative for their institutional reputation to produce a series of unquestioned artistic distinction, given that their only previous stamp release, the definitive issue of 1894, had merely been a utilitarian revamping of the 1890 series designed by the American Banknote Company. The new set would have to compare favorably with—or even better—the preceding, privately produced Columbian commemoratives. The resulting plan—more ambitious than the Columbians in one respect—was to print the Trans-Mississippi stamps with colored frames and black centers, which would have required two separate stages of printing (the Columbians had all been monocolored). During April 1898, however, the Spanish–American War began, and the Bureau of Engraving and Printing—now required to produce large numbers of revenue stamps—chose to save labor and press time by printing the Trans-Mississippi designs in single colors after all. This, however, meant that the dies designed for two-toned production had to be retooled (white space surrounding the vignettes had to be filled in with shading that reached the edge of the frames), a process that delayed the release of the stamps until June 17, more than two weeks after the Exposition opened.

Philatelic protests notwithstanding, they were received favorably by the general public. They were sold until the end of the year, and postmasters were directed to return unsold stock, which was then incinerated. (Although the numbers printed are known, the numbers returned were not recorded, and so the numbers of existing stamps are unknown.)

The stamps, designed by Raymond Ostrander Smith, all have the same shape of frame (a legacy of the bicolor plan); the numerals of value and "UNITED STATES OF AMERICA" at the top; and "POSTAGE" with a spelled-out value at the bottom up through the 50c denomination, the dollar values being in numerals. Ears of wheat and corn appear in odd corners of the frame. Each center design is inscribed with its title:

- 1¢ dark green – "Marquette on the Mississippi"
- 2¢ copper red – "Farming in the West"
- 4¢ orange – "Indian Hunting Buffalo"
- 5¢ dark blue – "Fremont on Rocky Mountains"
- 8¢ violet brown – "Troops Guarding Train"
- 10¢ slate – "Hardships of Emigration"
- 50¢ olive – "Western Mining Prospector"
- $1 black – "Western Cattle in Storm"
- $2 orange brown – "Mississippi River Bridge" (the Eads Bridge)
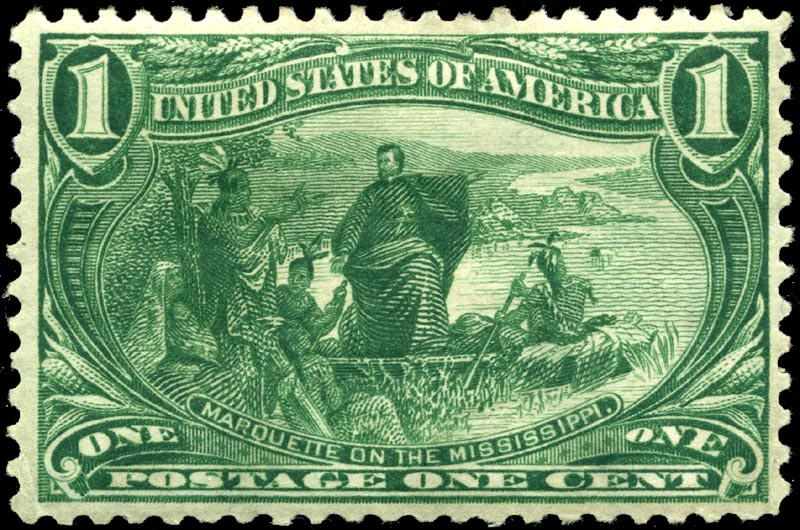
  The 1-cent value depicted Father Marquette on the Mississippi River.
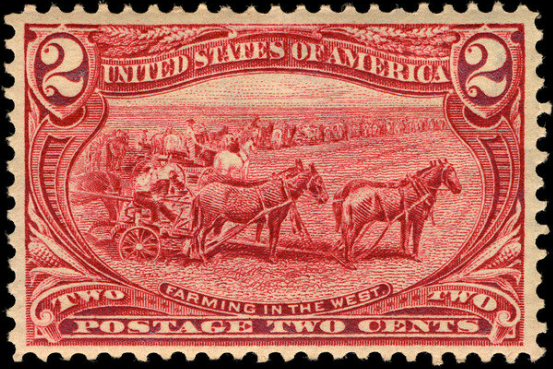
  "Farming in the West"
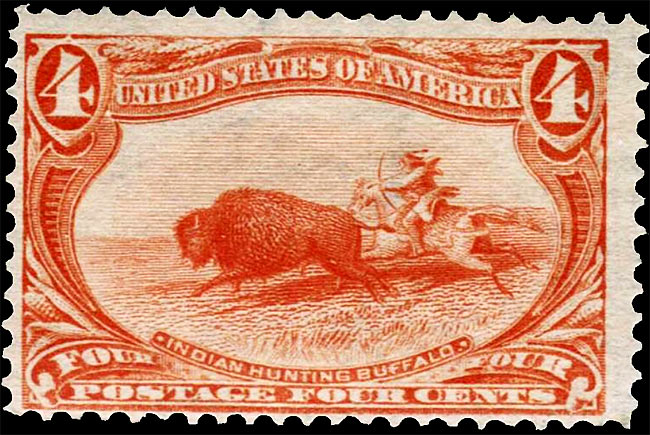
  "Indian Hunting Buffalo"
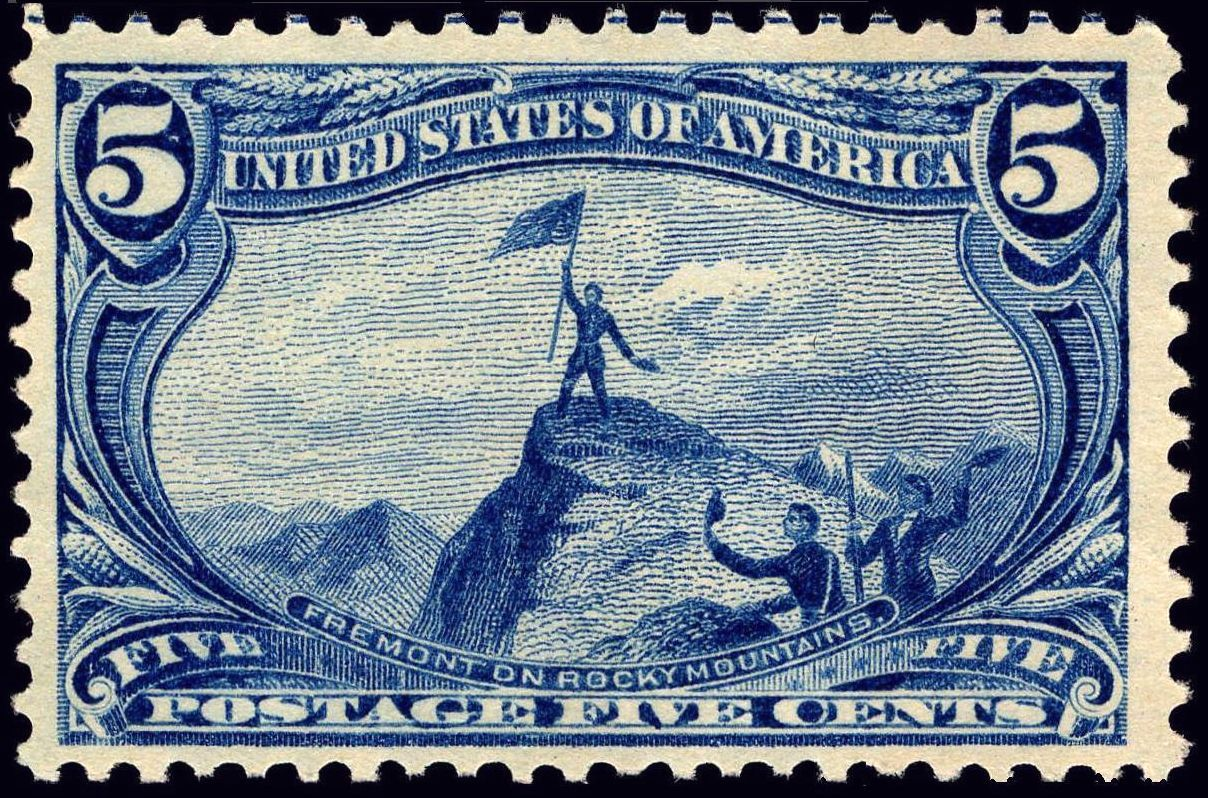
  "Fremont on Rocky Mountains"
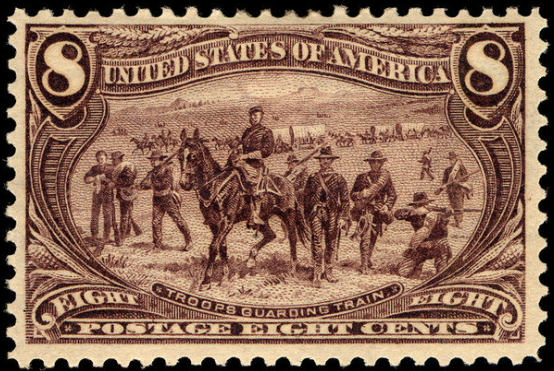
  "Troops guarding wagon train"
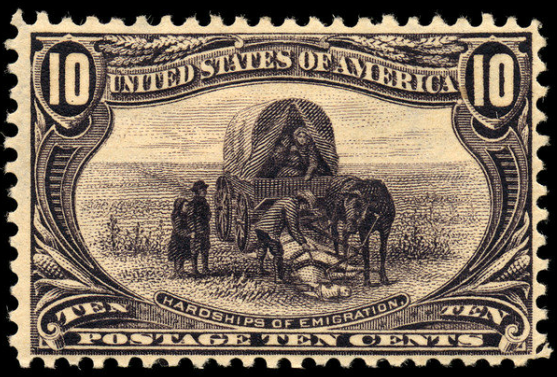
  "Hardships of emigration"
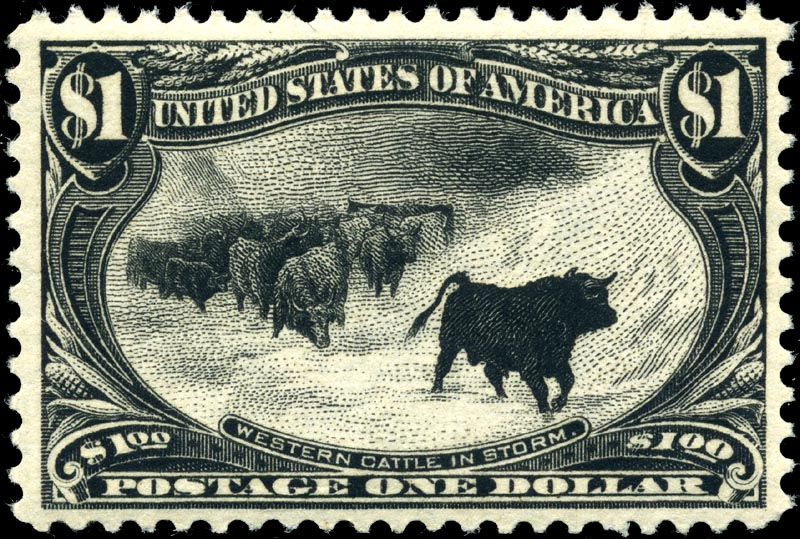
  "Black Bull" or "Western Cattle in Storm"
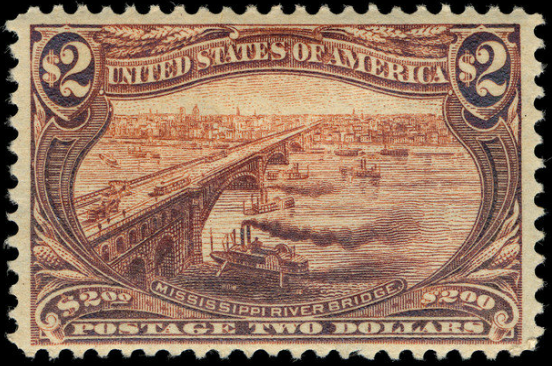
  Mississippi River bridge
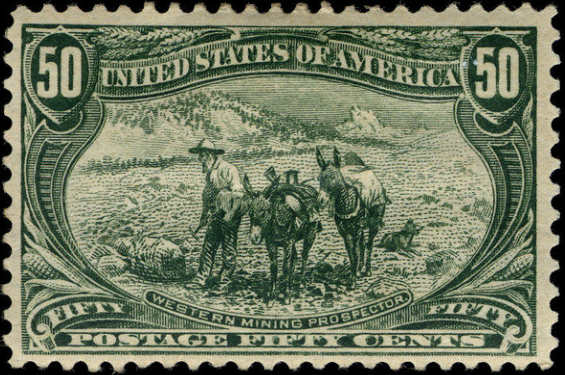
  "Western mining prospector"

The designs were adapted from various photographs, drawings, and paintings; both the 8¢ and 50¢ values reproduced drawings by Frederic Remington. While all have been praised for their quality, the $1 value, commonly called the "Black Bull", stands out from the rest. Ironically, it does not reproduce a Western American scene, but was taken from a painting of cattle in the Scottish Highlands by John A. MacWhirter (see also Western Cattle in Storm).

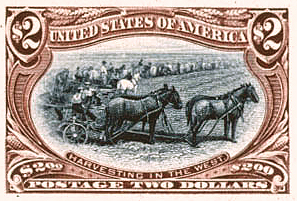
Bi-color essay for the $2 stamp (note: "Harvesting in the West" was ultimately reassigned to the 2¢ stamp and retitled "Farming in the West").

The vignettes of the issue were executed by three engravers: Marcus Baldwin (2¢, 5¢, 10¢, $1), George Smillie (1¢, 4¢, 50¢, $2) and Robert Ponickau (8¢). Baldwin also engraved all the frames except that of the 2¢ stamp, which was the work of Douglas Ronaldson—who in addition engraved all of the numerals and lettering of the Trans-Mississippi series.

The 2¢ stamp violates the convention of the time that no living person could be depicted on a U.S. Postal issue. In the photograph of North Dakota harvesting that served as the basis for the engraved vignette, the three figures in the foreground have been identified as the farm worker Ed Nybakken, the field boss Elihu Barber and the foreman Sam White.

During 1998, to commemorate the 100th anniversary of the issue, the United States Postal Service issued a miniature sheet of the nine, each printed in two colors, and a sheet of nine of the "Black Bull". In most of the images, the original color scheme was preserved, but for the "Black Bull" the hue of the frame was changed from violet-brown to bright red. The designs are reproductions; each has a small "1998" in the lower left corner. In a revival of the original designs, the pictures in the 2¢ and $2 stamps were swapped, and "Farming" was changed back to "Harvesting."

== See also ==
- Trans-Mississippi
