= Charles Sims (painter) =

English painter (1873–1928)

Charles Sims RA RWS
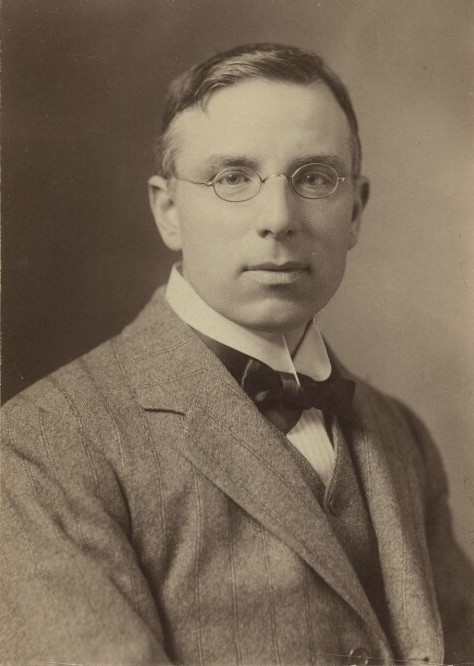
- 1900s portrait by Elliott & Fry, National Portrait Gallery, London
- Born: 28 January 1873; Islington, England
- Died: 13 April 1928 (aged 55); St. Boswells, Scotland
- Education: Académie Julian, Royal Academy Schools (expelled)
- Years active: 1886-1928
- Works: An Island Festival (1907); Clio and the Children (1913/15); the Spiritual Ideas (series, 1927-28)

Charles Henry Sims RA RWS (28 January 1873 –13 April 1928) was a British figurative painter known for his portraits and landscapes. He initially became renowned as a leading Edwardian painter, but following the death of his son in World War I, his work became increasingly idiosyncratic, surreal and controversial. In 1920, he was appointed Keeper, or head, of the Royal Academy Schools, a post he was eventually forced to resign in 1926. At the same time, he became estranged from his wife and children. Sims' final paintings, the Spiritual Ideas, were to some viewers his "most beautiful works," but to others highly disturbing. He committed suicide in 1928.

== Education and early career ==
Born in Islington, London, Sims was the son of a costume manufacturer. An injury in infancy threatened his life and resulted in lifelong lameness in one leg. His earliest memories were of painful physiotherapy, and as a child he was unable to fully participate in physical activities. This disability was to have a profound influence on his work as an artist. As his son and biographer Alan Sims writes, "His lameness…remained always a considerable burden," and "had much to do with the peculiar direction of his art towards playful subjects and athletic technique," so that "the most notable characteristics" included "a prepossession with the swift movement of flawless bodies bathed in sunlight and air" and "a determination to escape from the actual confines of physical life into a region of his own fancy.…The charm of his happiest pictures is heightened by this pathos."

Initially apprenticed in the drapery business, at age 14 he was sent to Paris, where he learned French. Turning his back on a mercantile career, he decided to study art, and in 1890 enrolled at the South Kensington College of Art before moving back to Paris for two years at the Académie Julian. In the need of bursaries to support himself, he moved back to London and enrolled at the Royal Academy Schools in 1893, but "his Parisian insolence and cavalier ways alienated the authorities, and in 1895 he was unceremoniously expelled."

Despite the expulsion, Sims "had gained the confidence to start painting bacchanalian scenes of revelry, executed with astonishing flair," including The Vine in 1896, his first painting to be exhibited at the Royal Academy. In 1897 he exhibited Childhood, which "established his mastery of the effects of sunlight"; it was shown at the Paris Salon of 1900 and purchased by the French State (it is now at the Musée d'Orsay). He specialized in neo-classical fantasies, typically idealized scenes of women and children (and sometimes fairies and fauns) in outdoor settings. He also found success as a painter of society portraits.

In 1897, he married Agnes, a daughter of the painter John MacWhirter. She and their children, sometimes captured in photographs, would become frequent models and subjects in his paintings.

In 1906, a one-man show at the Leicester Galleries brought him critical and financial success, allowing him to relocate to rural Fittleworth and then Lodsworth, both villages near Petworth, West Sussex.

In 1907 he painted An Island Festival, "possibly his masterpiece." In 1910, The Art Journal declared him "The very Ariel of the Academy…This is the art which Keats imagined in his 'Ode on a Grecian Urn,' 'For ever panting and for ever young.'"

In 1910 he was elected a fellow of the Royal Watercolour Society, and in 1915 to the Royal Academy.

The "breezy, sunny, outdoor subjects" for which he became known were partly inspired by holidays in Arran in Scotland and later at Bruges in Belgium and at Étaples in France, where there was an international artists' colony. In 1921, art critic P.G. Konody reflected on Sims' body of joyous paintings:

Life is an eternal Arcadian holiday for him.…The key-note of his art is an intense joie de vivre. And this joie de vivre expressed in his paintings is contagious. The serene happiness of Sims' art makes the spectator forget all the worries and tribulations and petty concerns of his daily life.

The New York Times found in Sims' works "an individuality incapable of dullness or heaviness," and "an unquenchable sprit."

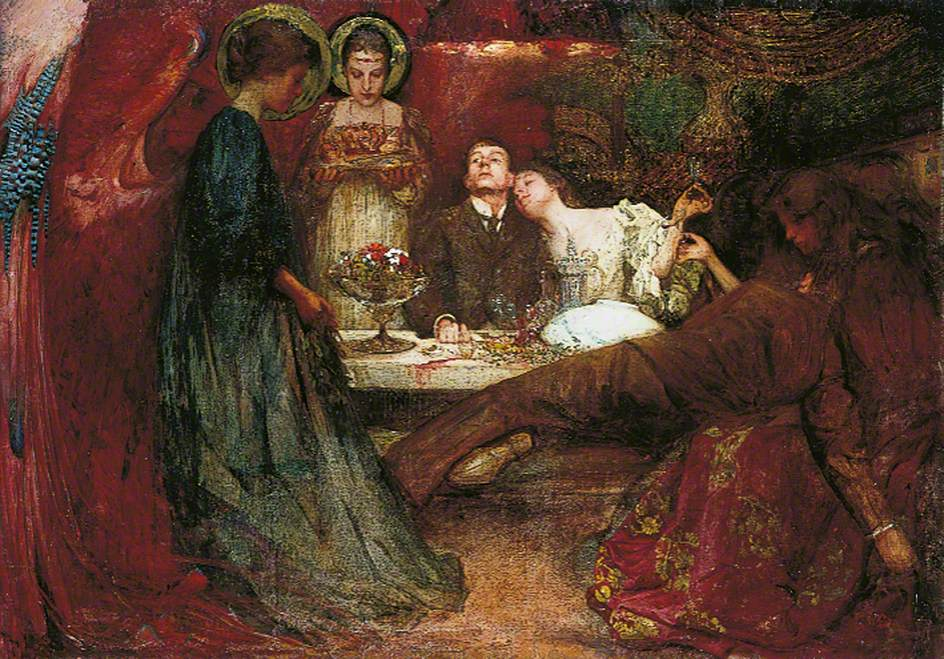
"What are these to me and you who deeply drink of wine?" (1895)

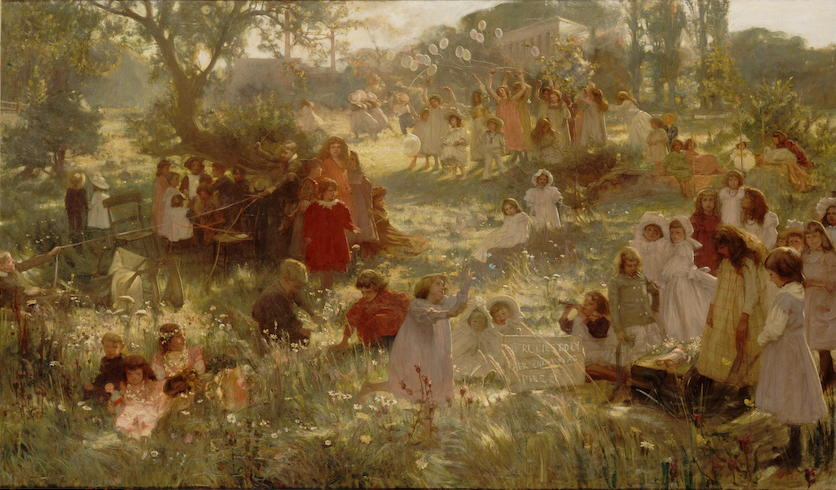
Childhood (1897)

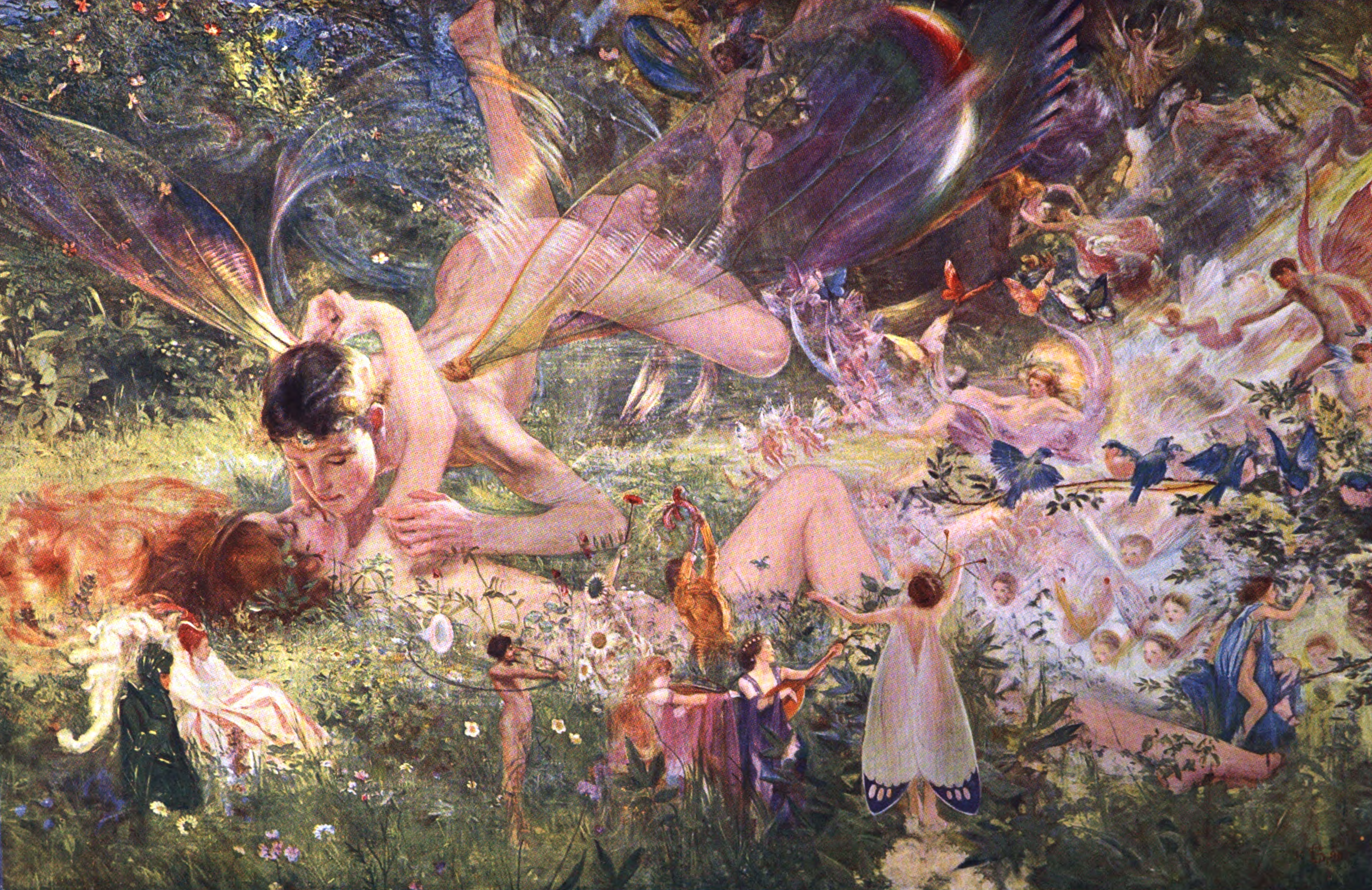
A Fairy Wooing (1898)

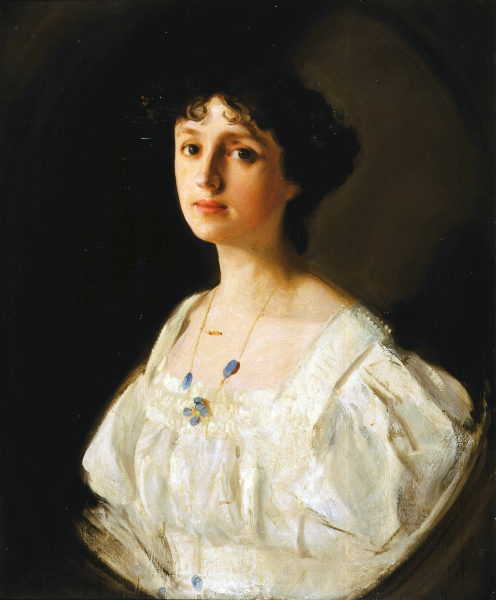
Dame Lilian Braithwaite (c. 1902)

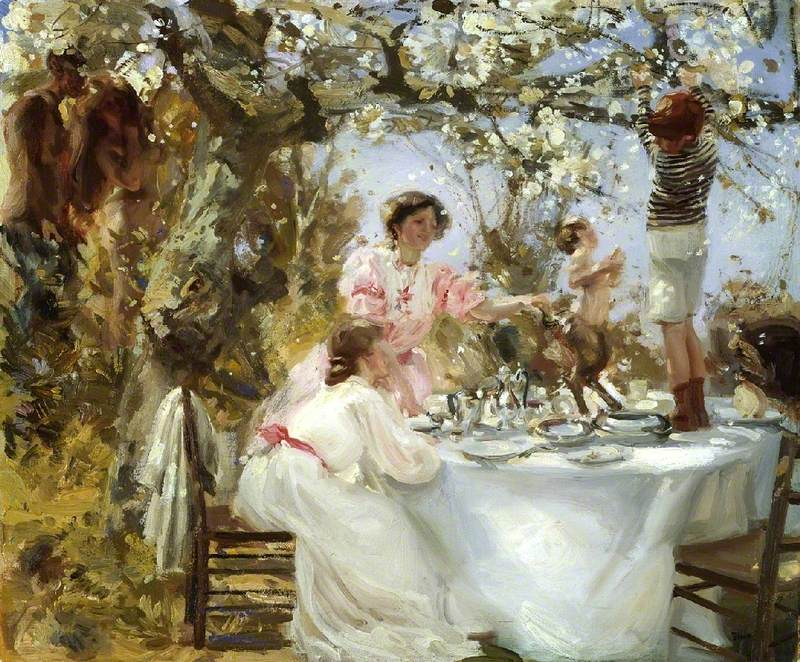
The Little Faun (version of 1905–1906)

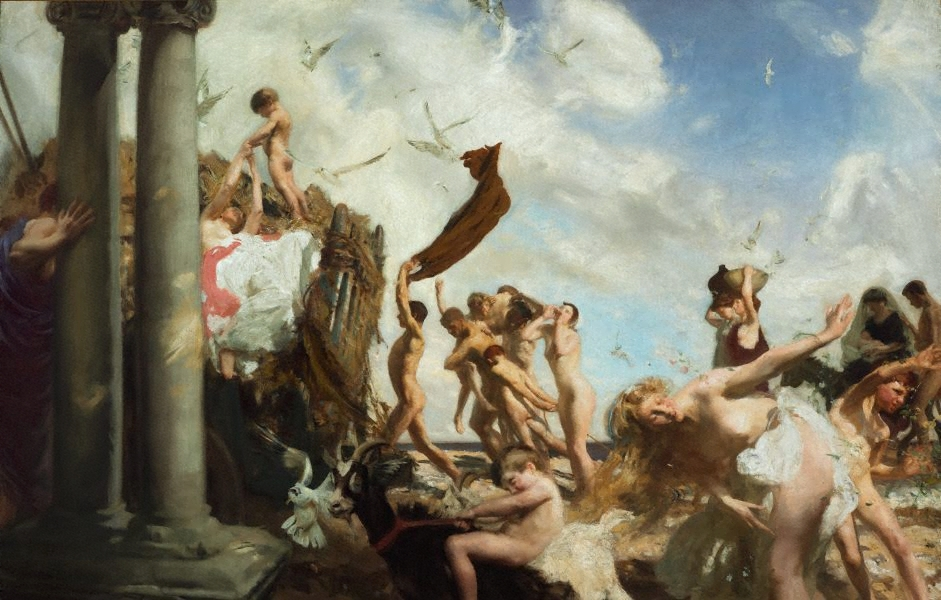
An Island Festival (1907)

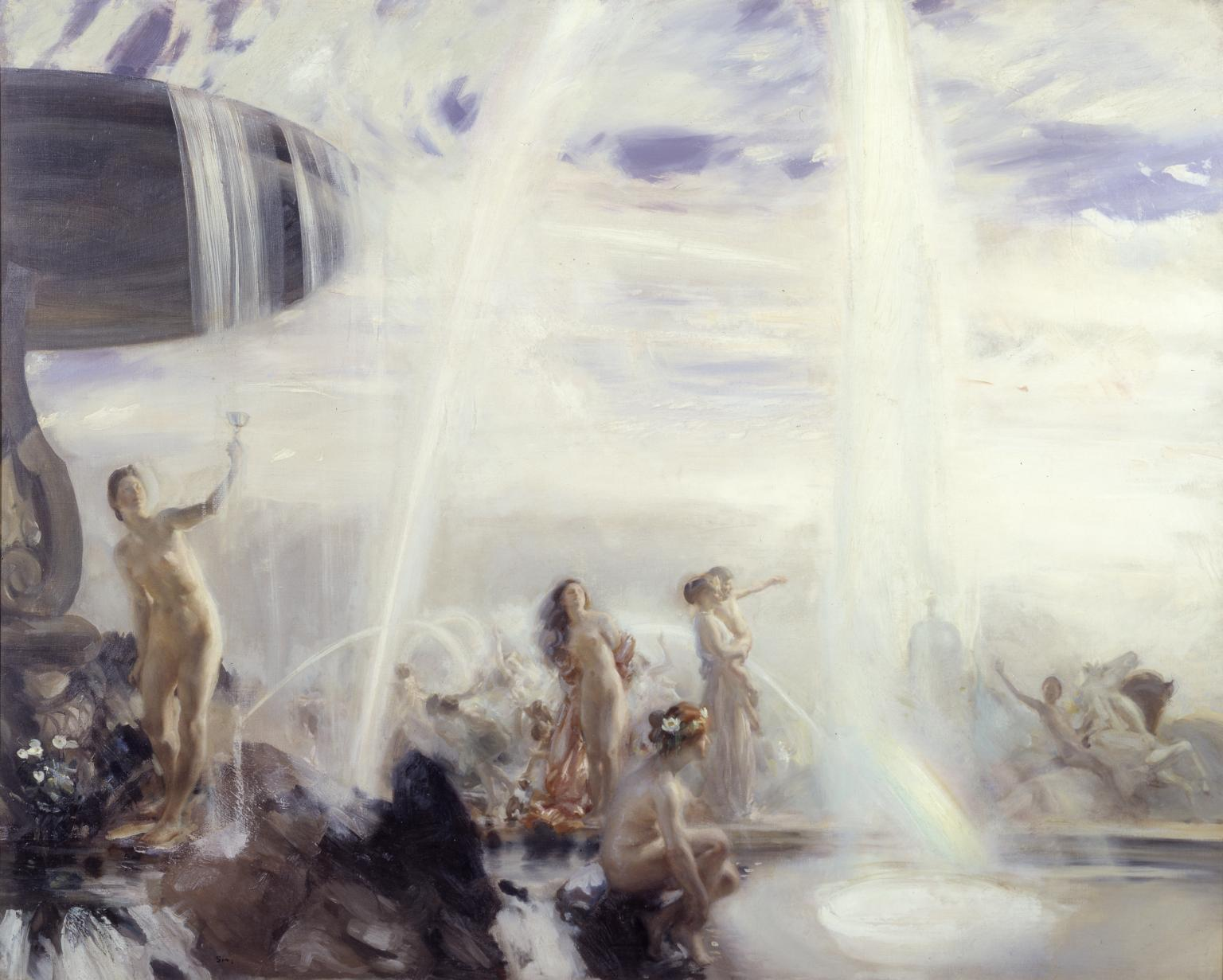
The Fountain (1907/8)

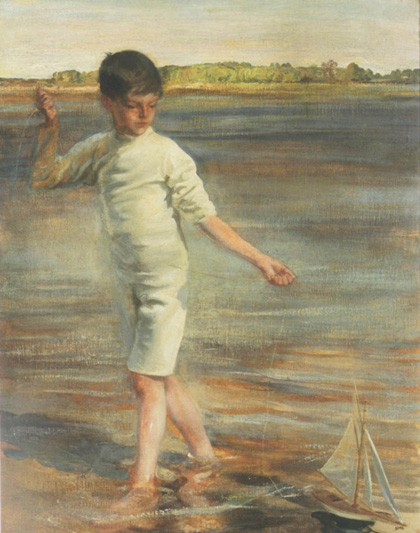
Kenneth Clark (c. 1911)

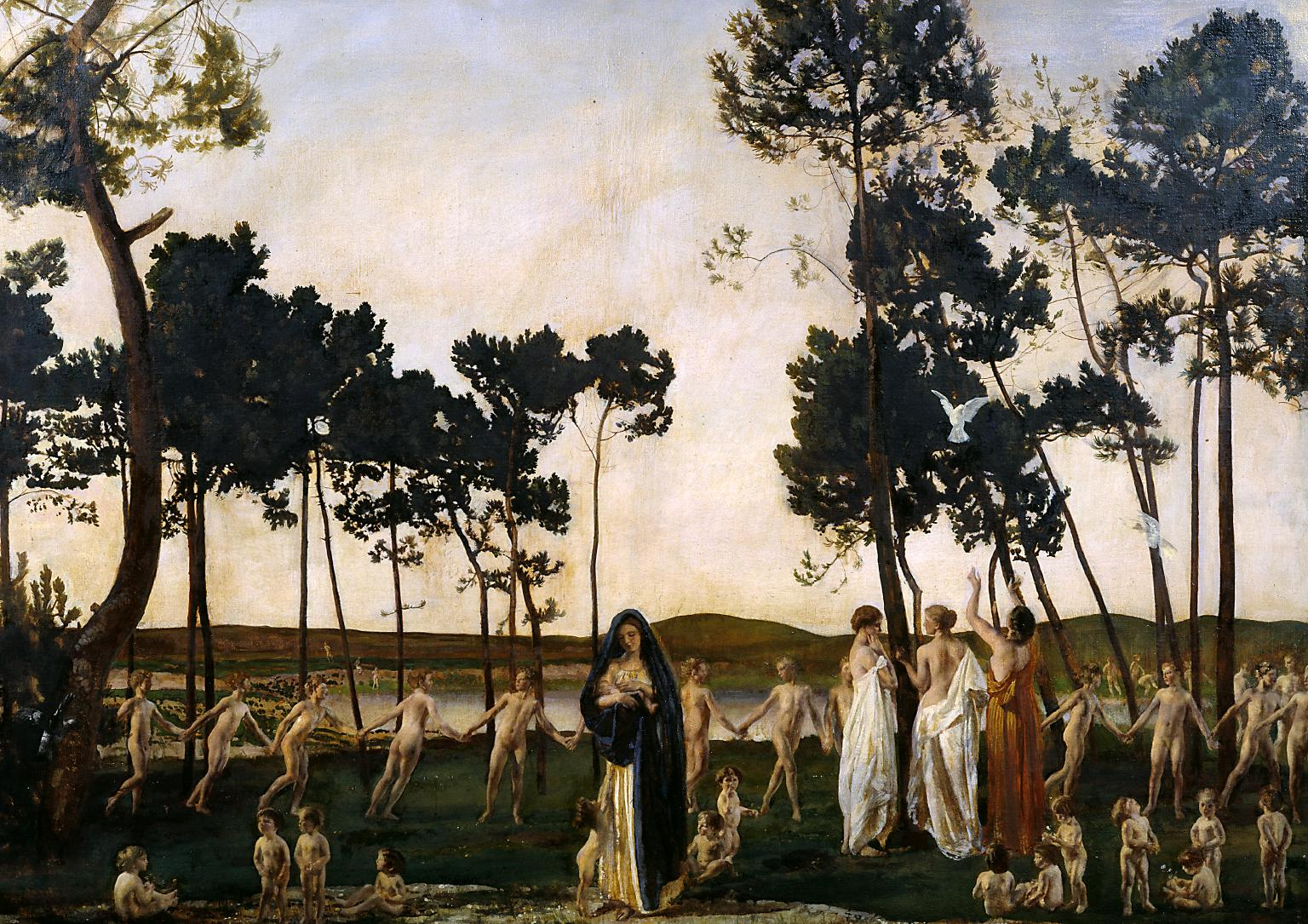
The Wood Beyond the World (1913)

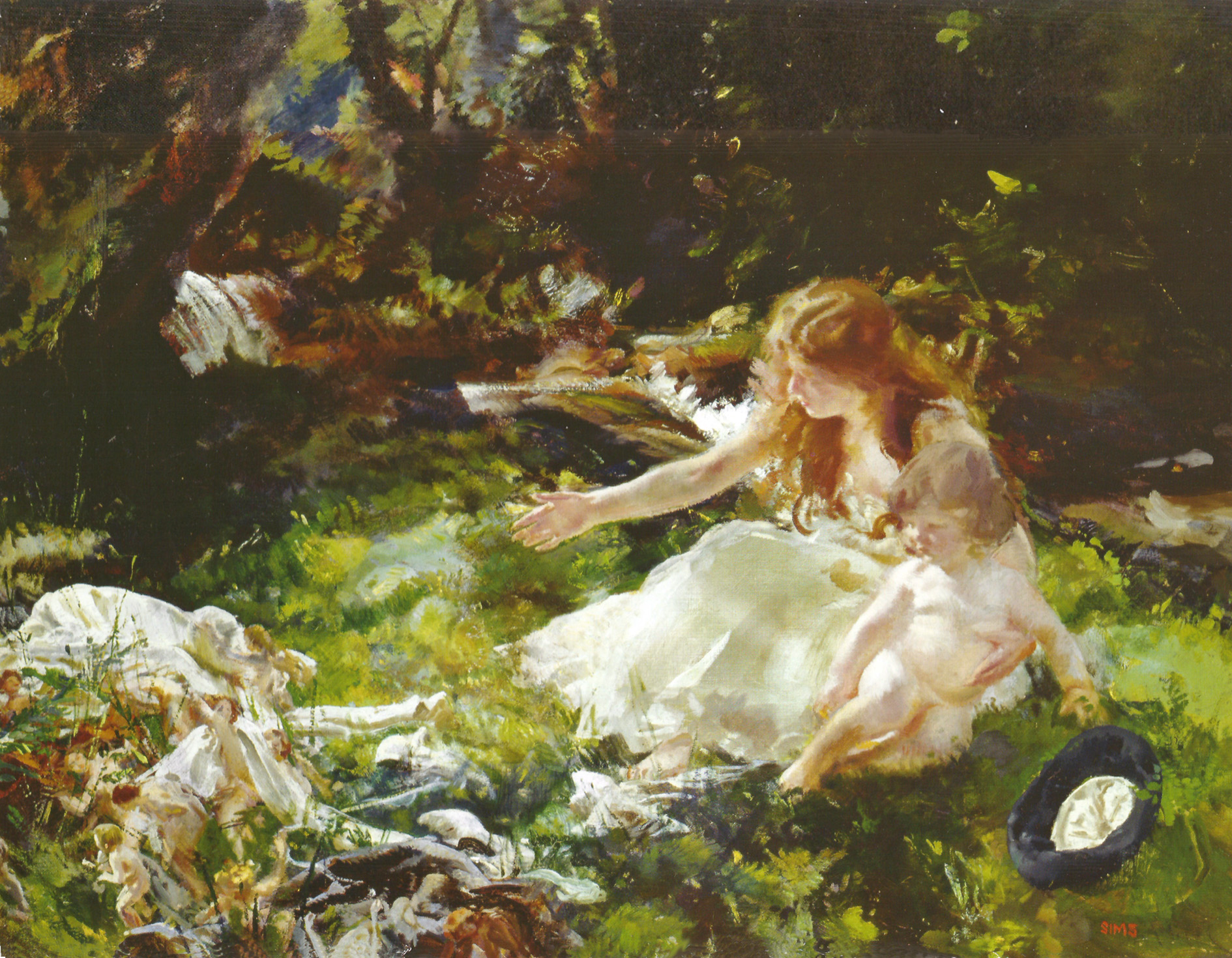
"...and the fairies ran away with their clothes" (n.d.)

== The First World War ==
The First World War was a deeply traumatic experience for Sims. His eldest son, John, serving as a midshipman in the Royal Navy, was killed in November 1914, in the loss of HMS Bulwark, a blow that caused Sims in 1915 to add to his idyllic work Clio and the Children, staining the scroll of the Muse of History with red paint to represent blood. "Sims believed that the War had violated the innocence of future generations. He felt that History could no longer be personified as a beautiful goddess passing on wisdom but that she had more violent lessons to teach." Sims's son is among the missing commemorated on the Portsmouth Naval Memorial.

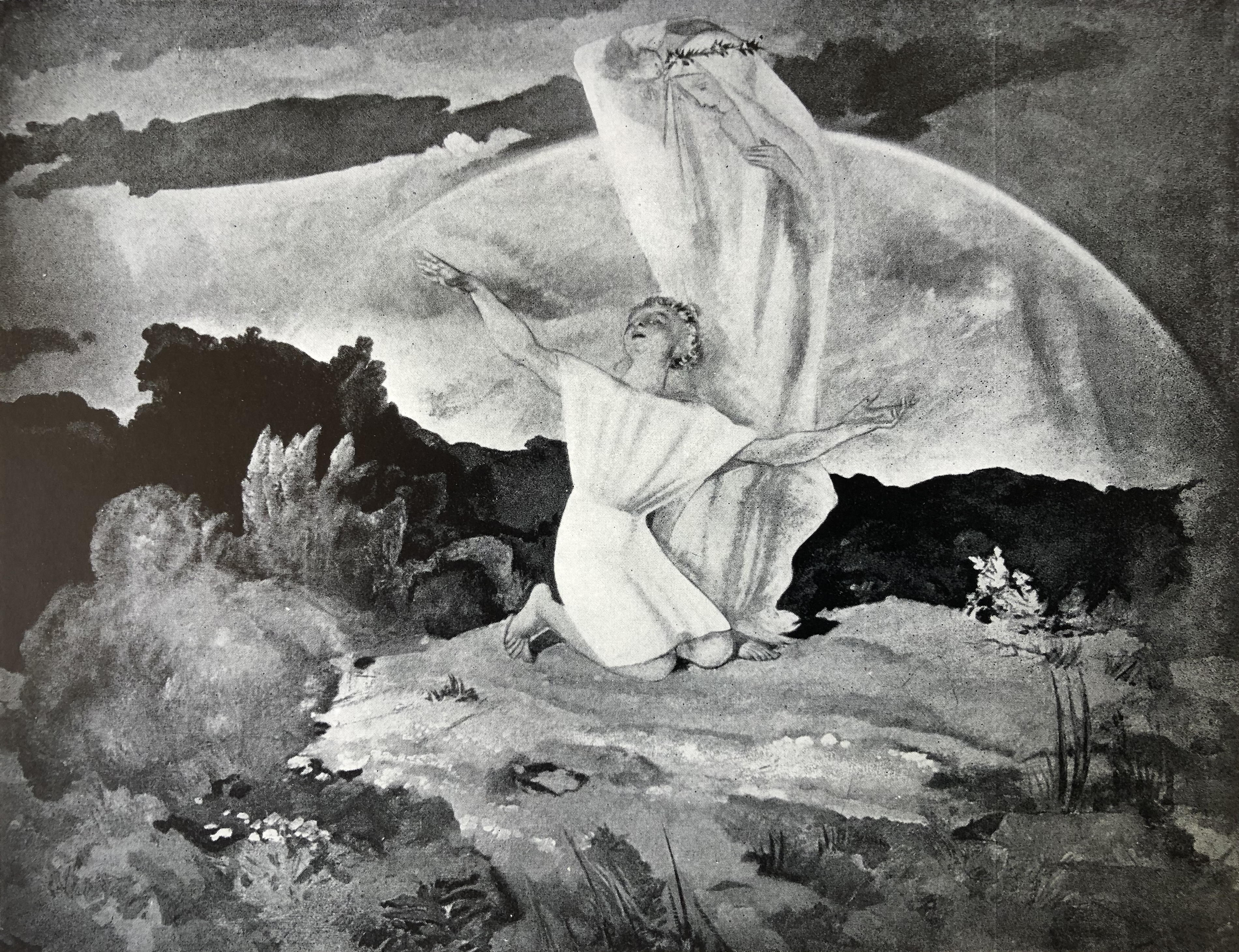
Marriage, from The Seven Sacraments of the Holy Church (1917).

In February 1917, Sims exhibited a suite of austere, idiosyncratic, deliberately archaic paintings depicting The Seven Sacraments of the Holy Church. According to his son Alan, "Nobody knew what to make of them." Their present location is unknown, and they are today the least-known of his works.

In 1918, he traveled to France as an official war artist, painting a series of devastated landscapes. He also painted works memorializing the war dead, using the imagery of the Crucifixion. In Greater Love Hath No Man (1916), his own son appears on a cross, with members of the family below. Another crucifixion on a much larger scale and with panoramic details, with Christ on the cross, became Sims' contribution to the Canadian War Museum, Sacrifice (1919).

In 1920 Sims was commissioned to decorate the ceiling of the Institute of Civil Engineers in Great George Street, Westminster, and the result was a more conventional but still "highly inventive" paean to the war effort, wherein "a figure of Victory swoops down, surrounded by a billowing Union Jack and holding the victor's laurels, although it also serves as a wreath for the dead. At the edges people crane their necks to peer upwards…and a biplane, emblem of modernity, crosses the composition." Victory wears a hood and most of her face cannot be seen.

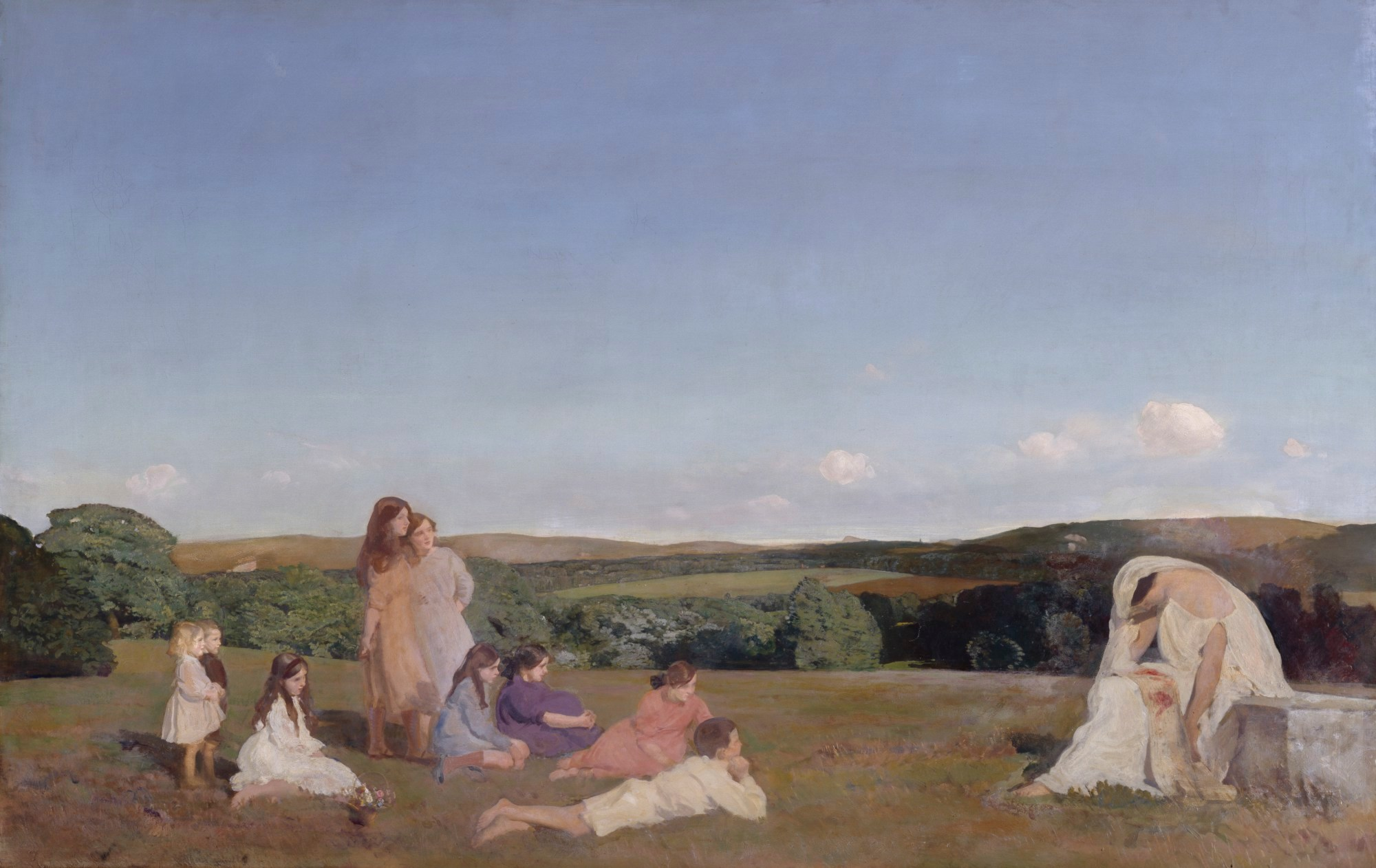
Clio and the Children (1913/15)

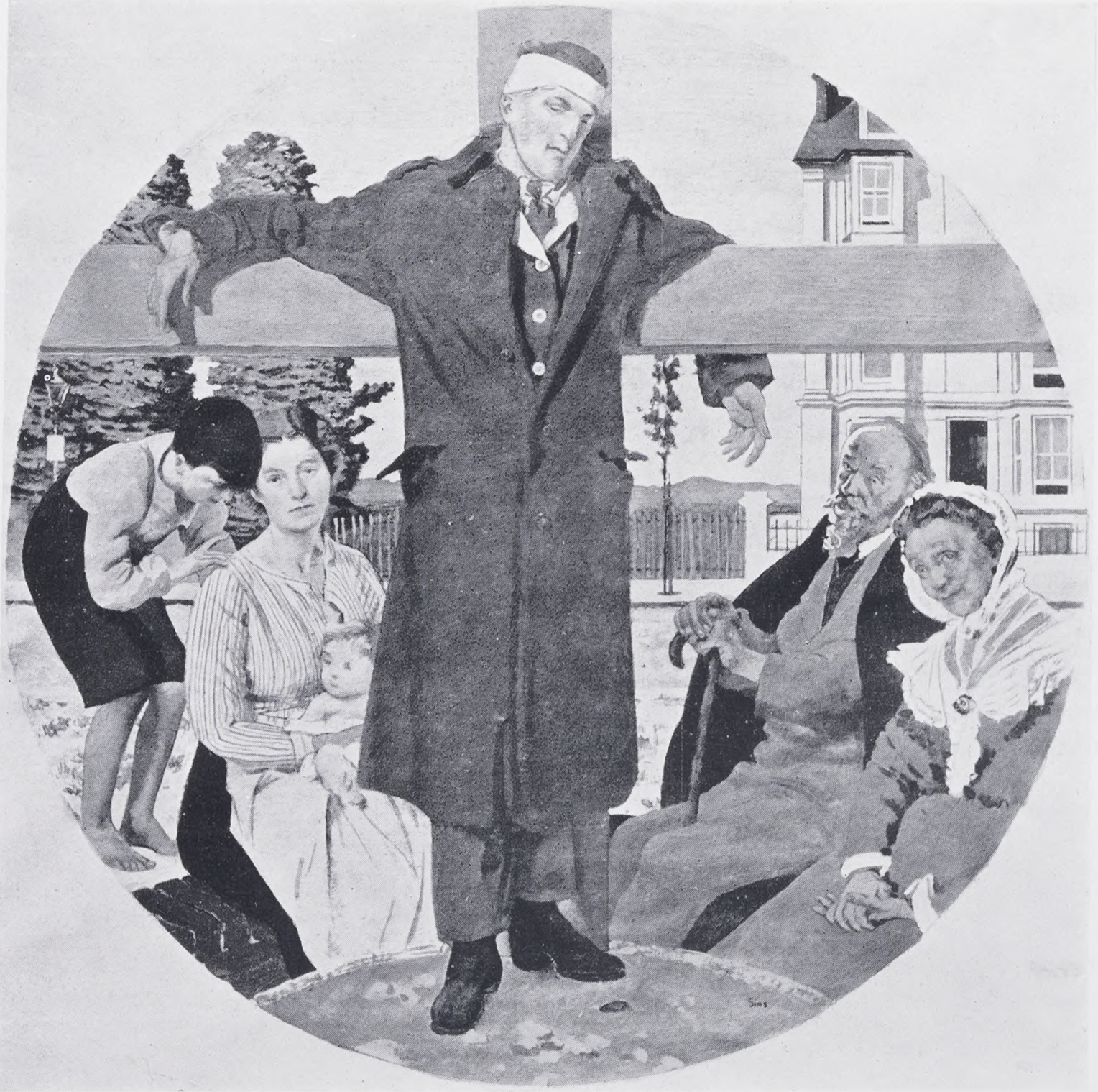
Greater Love Hath No Man (1916)

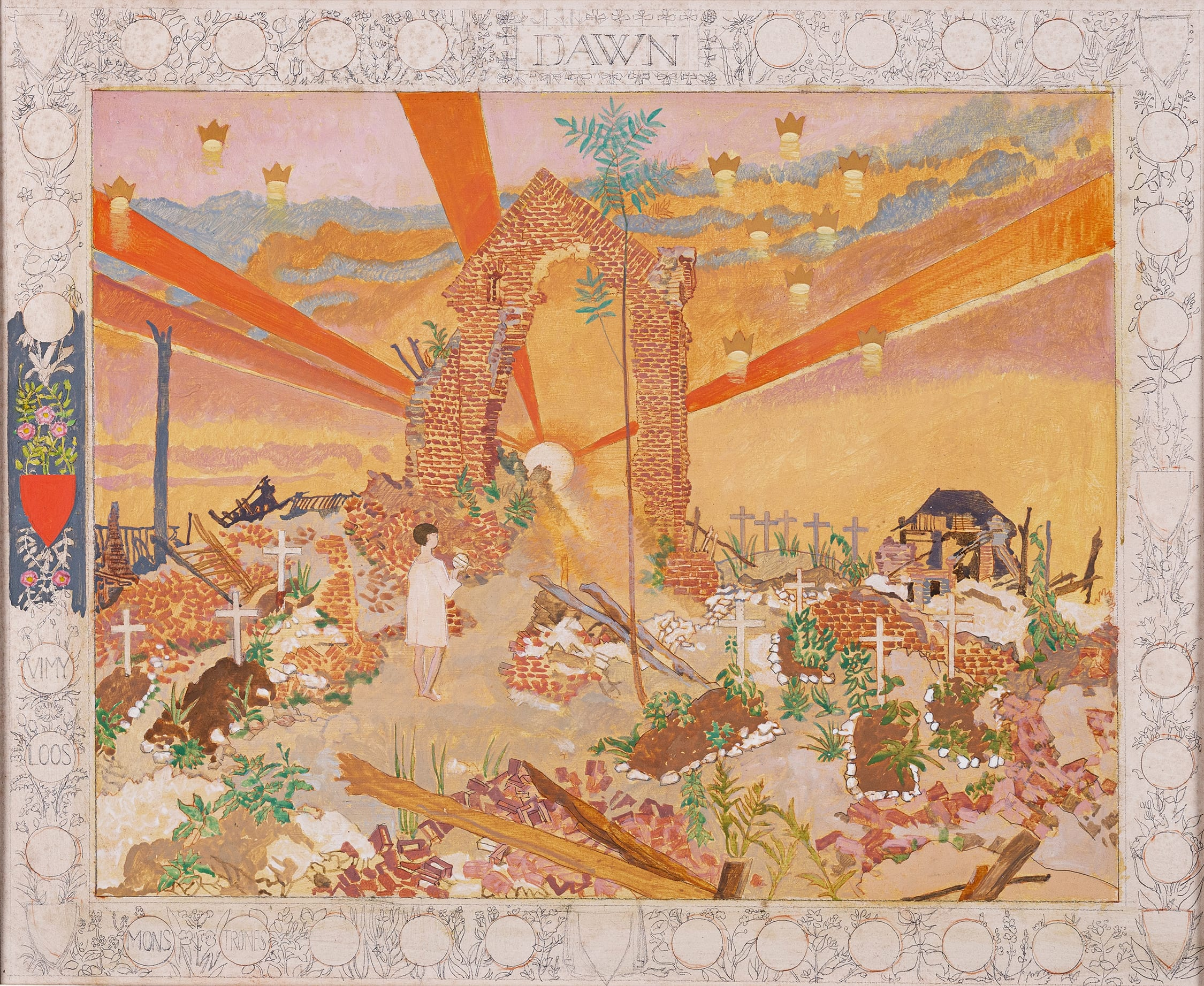
Dawn over the battlefields of Vimy, Loos, Mons, Trones (c. 1918)

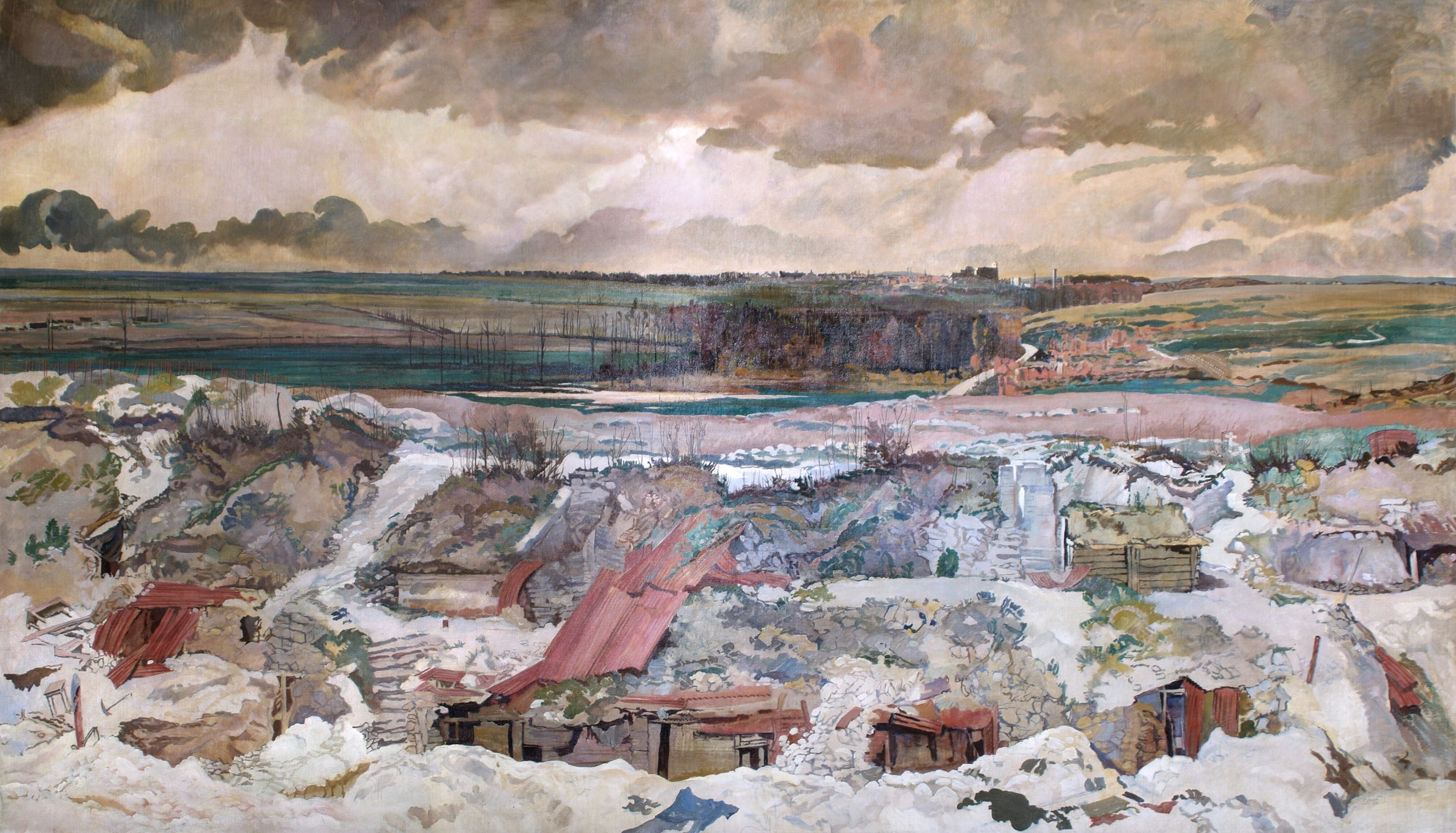
The Old German Front Line, Arras, 1916 (1919)

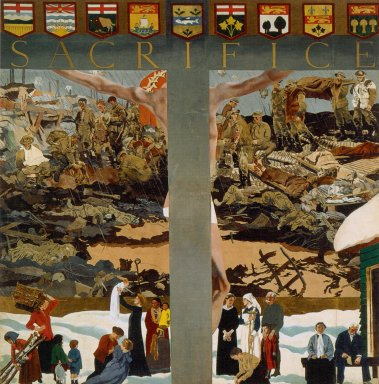
Sacrifice (1919)

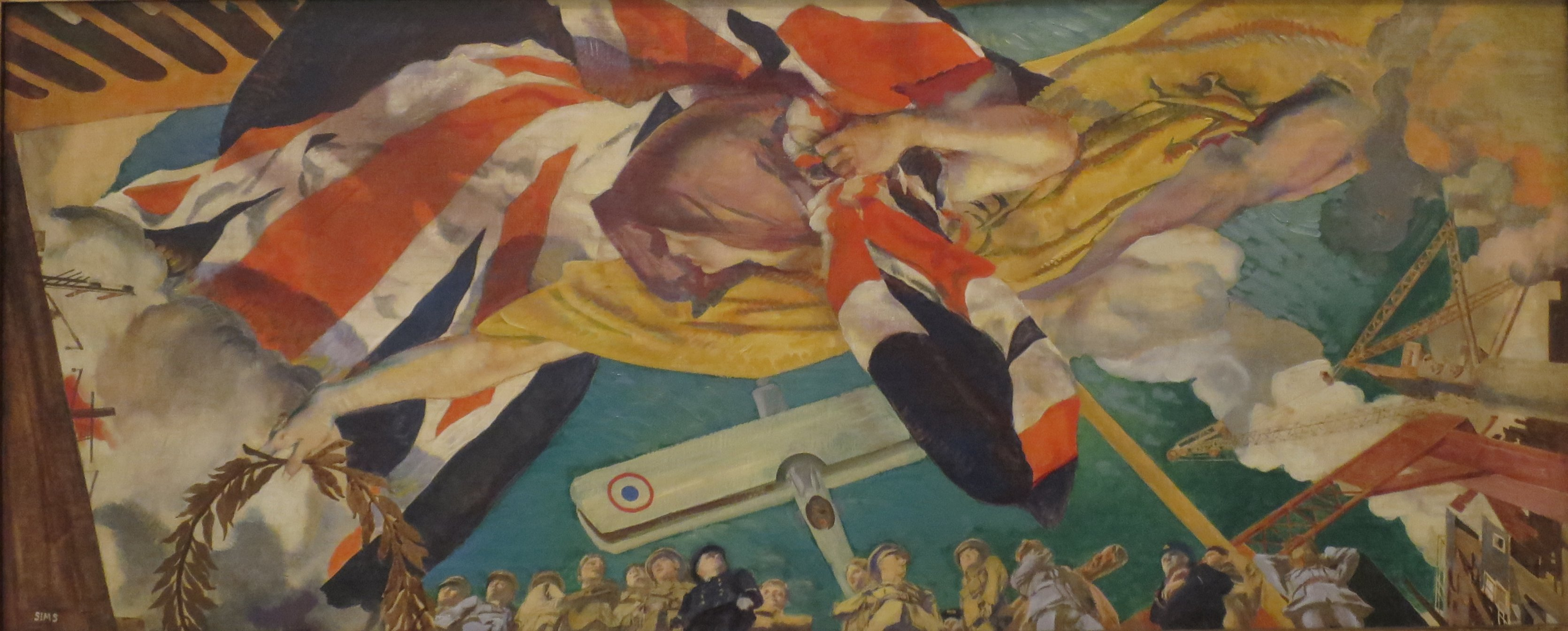
Study for Ceiling Painting for the Great Hall of the Institute of Civil Engineers (c. 1920)

== Professional controversies, personal upheavals ==
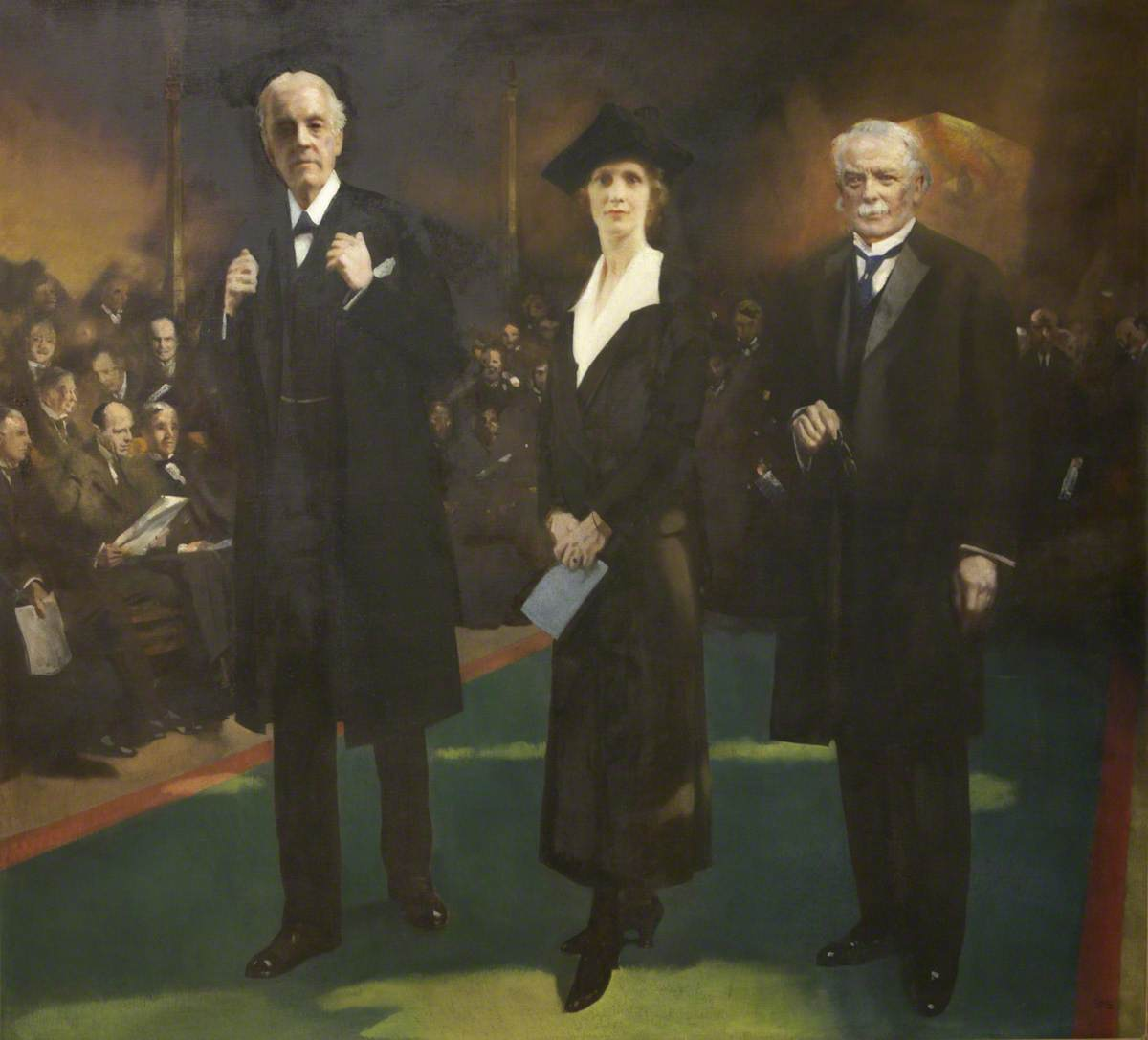
Introduction of Lady Astor as the First Woman MP (c. 1919)

In the last decade of his life, Sims' work became increasingly controversial.

The Introduction of Lady Astor as the First Woman Member of Parliament in 1919 was commissioned by Lord Astor…Astor is standing between her two sponsors, then Prime Minister David Lloyd George and Lord President of the Council Arthur Balfour. A version of the Nancy Astor painting was originally given to the Houses of Parliament in 1924 to mark the historical occasion and was designed to hang on the grand staircase leading to the Committee Rooms. It was defaced when it was first hung. The painting was covered with a dustsheet while an enquiry about its suitability took place. It was eventually removed as it is not common practice to display paintings of living politicians.

In 2019, a surviving version of the painting, on loan from The Box, Plymouth, was put on display in the Member's Dining Room in the Palace of Westminster to mark the centenary of Astor taking her seat.

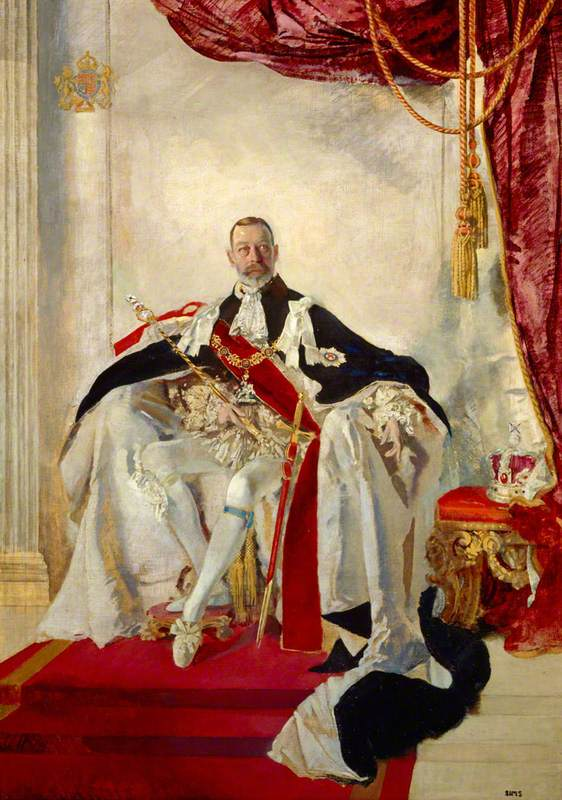
George V (surviving version, c. 1924)

In 1920, Sims was appointed Keeper, or head, of the Royal Academy Schools, an ironic achievement for a man who had himself been expelled as a student. The position included a residence in Burlington House, and "placed him at the very heart of the organisation, as the guardian of future generations of painters rigorously drilled in the traditional methods of drawing and composition."

As Keeper, Sims had been commissioned to produce a portrait of the king, George V, to add to the Academy's complete series of British monarchs since its foundation. The portrait was exhibited in 1924…but when it became known that the king was unhappy with Sims' florid—and seemingly frivolous—handling of the figure and the drapery, in 1925…it was returned to the artist. Sims, despite agreeing not to exhibit the picture, showed it in New York for a few months, and returned there the following year for several weeks, painting portraits…When Sims's prolonged absence from his duties in the Schools was challenged, he chose to resign. In order to avoid any further damaging publicity, the Academy reacquired the portrait. It was decided first to cut out and burn the head, and then, in April 1927, to consign the entire canvas to the boiler in the basement of Burlington House.

A surviving, smaller version of Sims' portrait of George V is kept at the Scottish National Portrait Gallery.

In 1925, Sims was commissioned to contribute to "The Building of Britain," a series of historical paintings by various artists in St. Stephen's Hall of the Palace of Westminster in London. Unveiled in 1927, King John assents to Magna Carta attracted criticism from the press, Members of Parliament and other artists for its idiosyncrasy.

Added to these professional tribulations and lingering grief for his son was upheaval in Sims' personal life. His biographer H. Cecilia Holmes suggests that Sims took as his mistress Vivienne Jeudwine, whose portrait with her son (possibly by Sims) he exhibited at the Royal Academy in 1924. Another portrait of Jeudwine by Sims, undated, is unabashedly intimate. His affair with Jeudwine eventually ended, but Sims was irreconcilably estranged from his wife, Agnes. When he vacated the Keeper's residence at Burlington House in June, 1926, "he did not return to his wife and children—by this stage his marriage was dead in all but name—but embarked upon a series of foreign trips and long-term spells as a guest in the homes of friends."

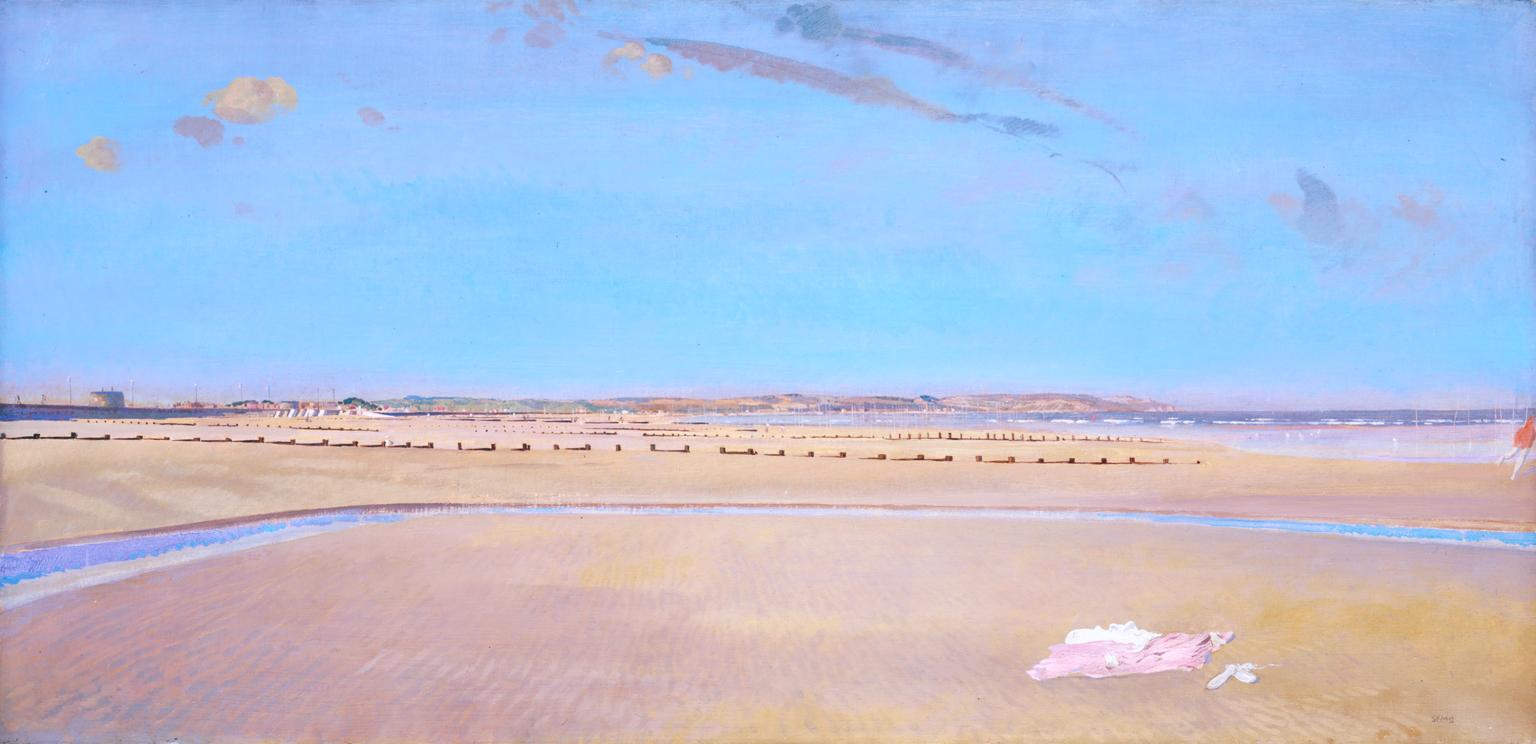
The Sands at Dymchurch (c. 1920-2)

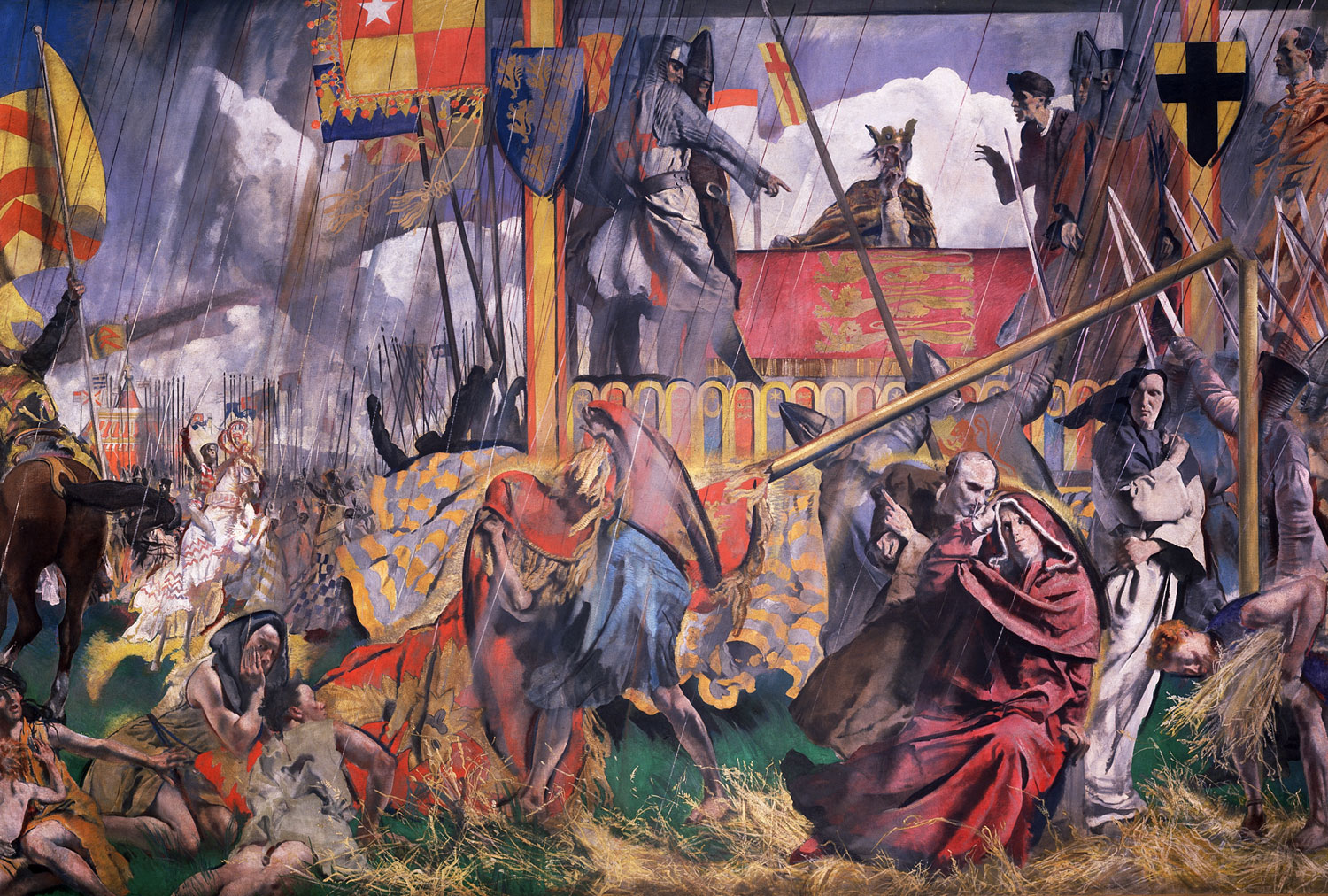
King John assents to Magna Carta (1925-1927)

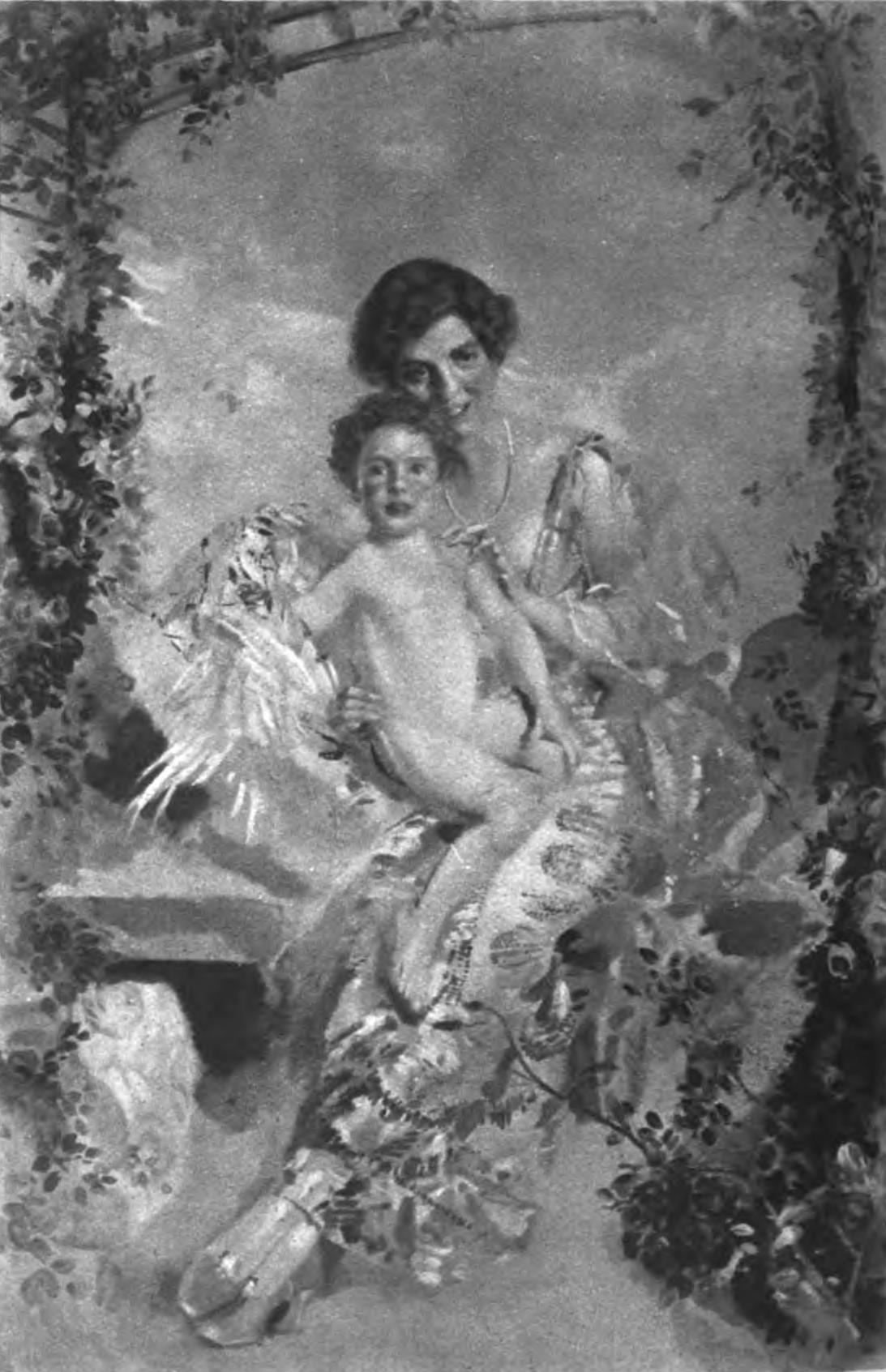
Mrs. Jeudwine and her son Wynne (1924)

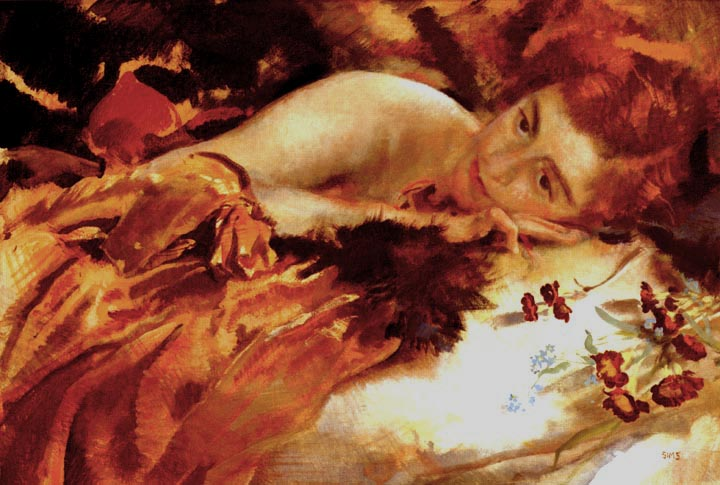
Portrait of Vivienne Jeudwine, undated

== The Spiritual Ideas and subsequent suicide ==
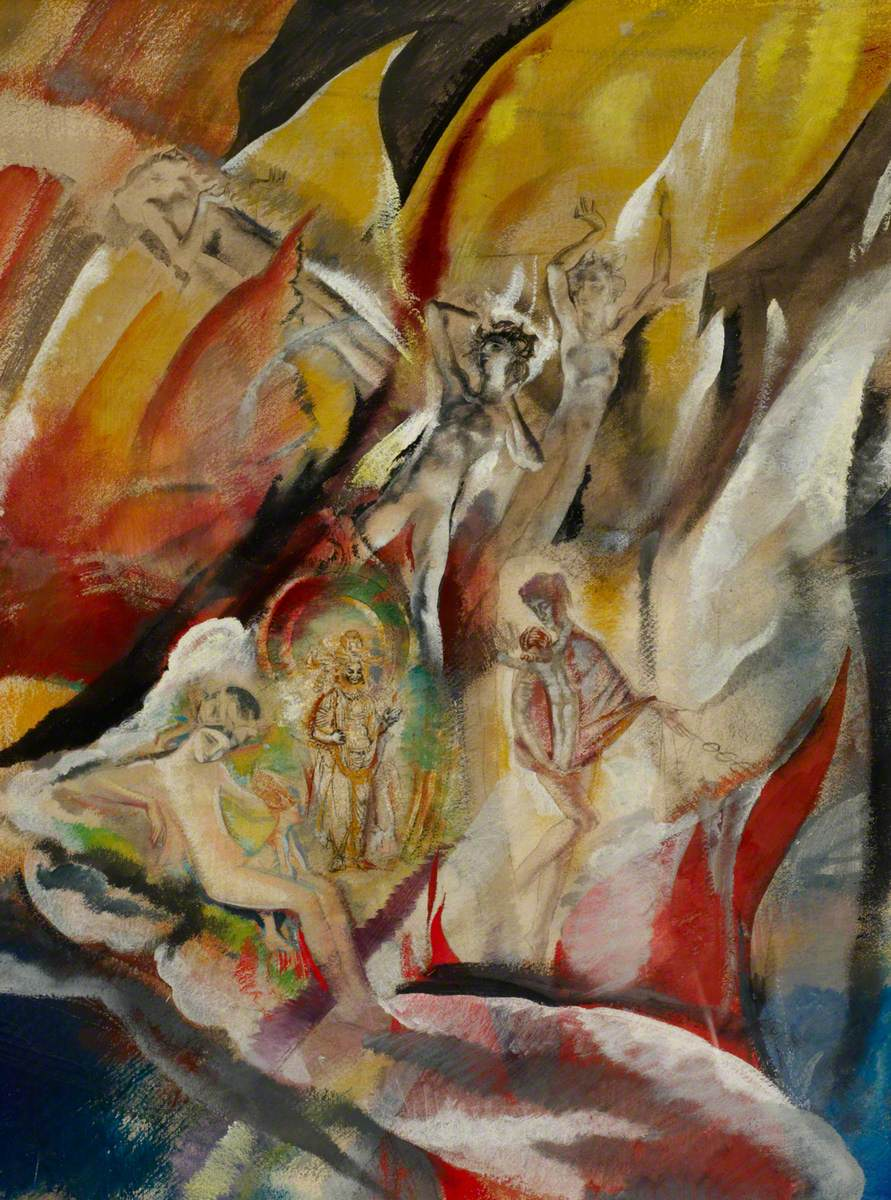
Crowds of Small Souls in Flame (1927)

Abandoning portraiture and representational painting altogether, Sims embarked on the final phase of his creative career, which resulted in a series of paintings that would be termed the Spiritual Ideas. They depict visually smeared and abstracted maelstroms of cosmic energy in which naked and contorted figures are overwhelmed by gigantic, personified forces; their enigmatic content and Sims' apparent turn to a modernist style startled and confused the artistic establishment. Critics likened the paintings to the works of El Greco, William Blake, Wassily Kandinsky, and the Italian Futurists.

In private letters from March 1928, Sims wrote of his "acute mental distress," saying that "something has happened far away, something that I need have no shame in telling you one day"; it is believed he was referring to his estrangement from his wife, which further isolated him as he was grieving the loss of his son. On 13 April 1928, weeks before a Royal Academy exhibition including six of Sims' Spiritual Ideas was to open on 7 May, he committed suicide by drowning in the River Tweed near St. Boswells, Scotland, jumping from the Leaderfoot Viaduct with stones in his pockets.

Contemporary viewers of the exhibition were concerned about the content of the paintings, especially with regard to Sims' mental health and subsequent suicide, and saw critical reception of the exhibition as insensitive. The RA president, Sir Frank Dicksee, who had previously overseen the destruction of Sims' portrait of George V, said the paintings were "in marked contrast to all his previous work," indicating "a violent change of mentality."

Ultimately, to address the public's curiosity, all six of the exhibited Spiritual Ideas were illustrated in colour in the popular press; a headline in the New York Times declared "Suicide's Pictures Make London Gasp." Months later, when four of the Spiritual Ideas were shown in the United States as part of the annual Carnegie International, they "were unquestionably the profound sensation of that exhibition."

Sims' state of mind was addressed by Frank Rutter, critic of The Sunday Times: "A man who has been suffering from continued insomnia may well not be responsible for his actions, but he is not necessarily insane. To suggest that there are traces of mania in these last and most beautiful works from his brush betrays a lamentable lack of understanding, and is an undeserved slight on the memory of a sweet and reasonable painter."

Sims himself, in a posthumously published essay, reflected on the Spiritual Ideas:

I wished to do subjects of tenderness and protection, to visualize a God of love. [...] The actual God, the God whom our reason admits, is cruel, tolerates war, creates the passions, fills men with inhumanity so that they inflict suffering on each other and on beasts, and urges beasts to prey on each other's living flesh, causing horrible protracted agonies. [...] [H]ow can we write about, or draw the symbols of, a beneficent God?

Alan Sims wrote of his father's suicide: "He himself followed out his Epicureanism to its logical conclusion, and ceased to live when he ceased to believe in future happiness."

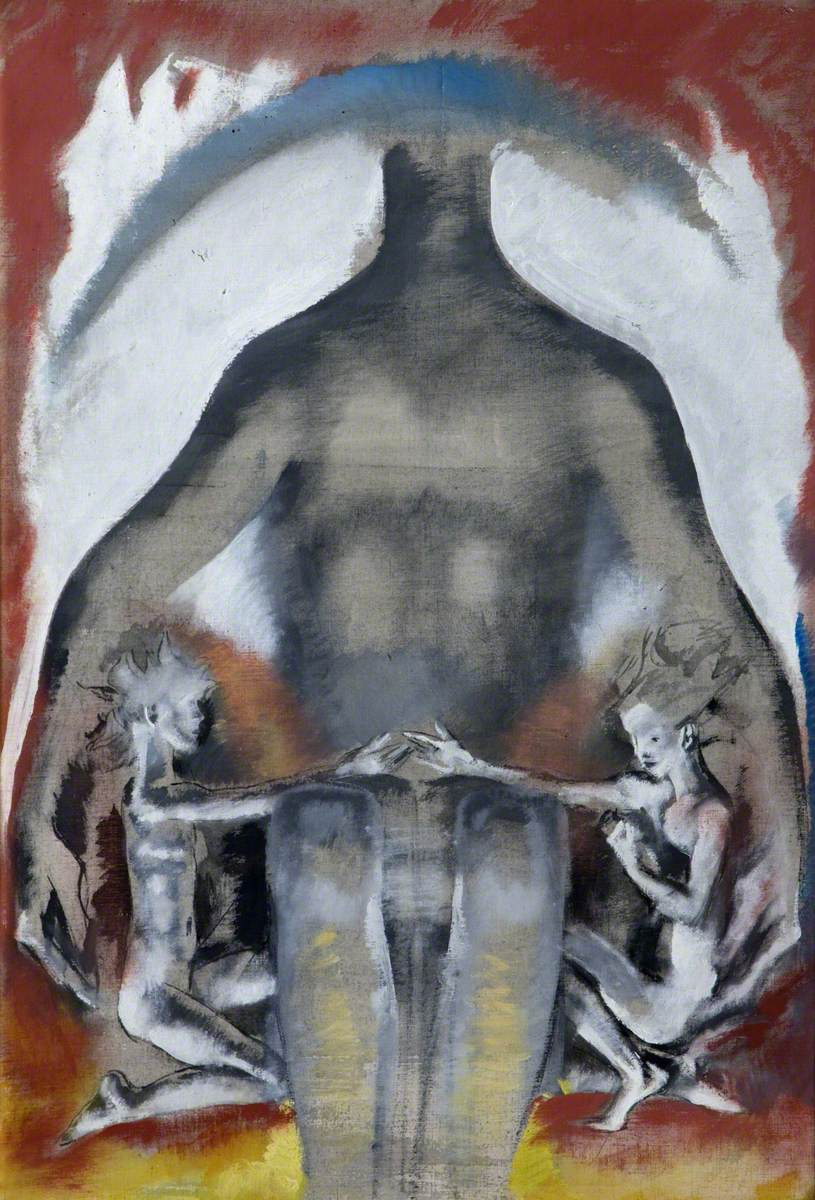
Saints and Sinners (c. 1927)

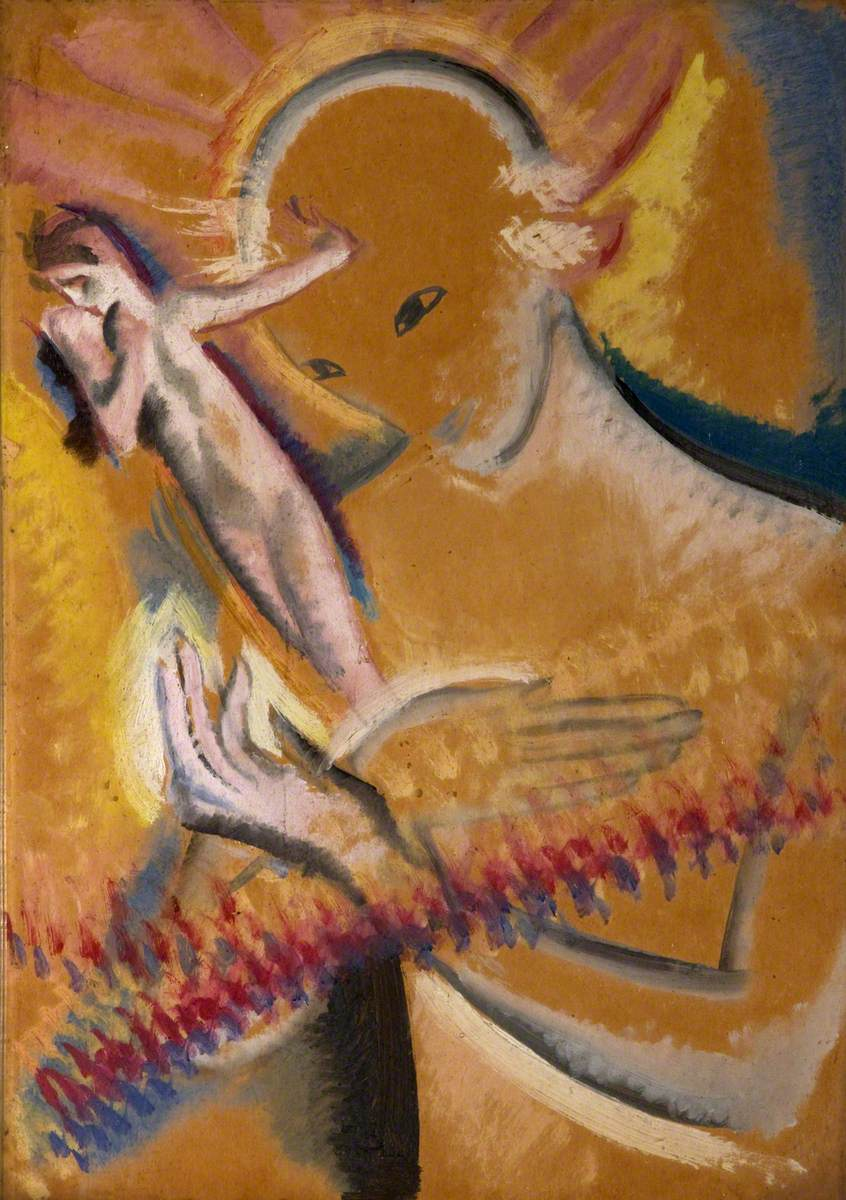
Man's Last Pretence of Consummation in Indifference (c. 1927)

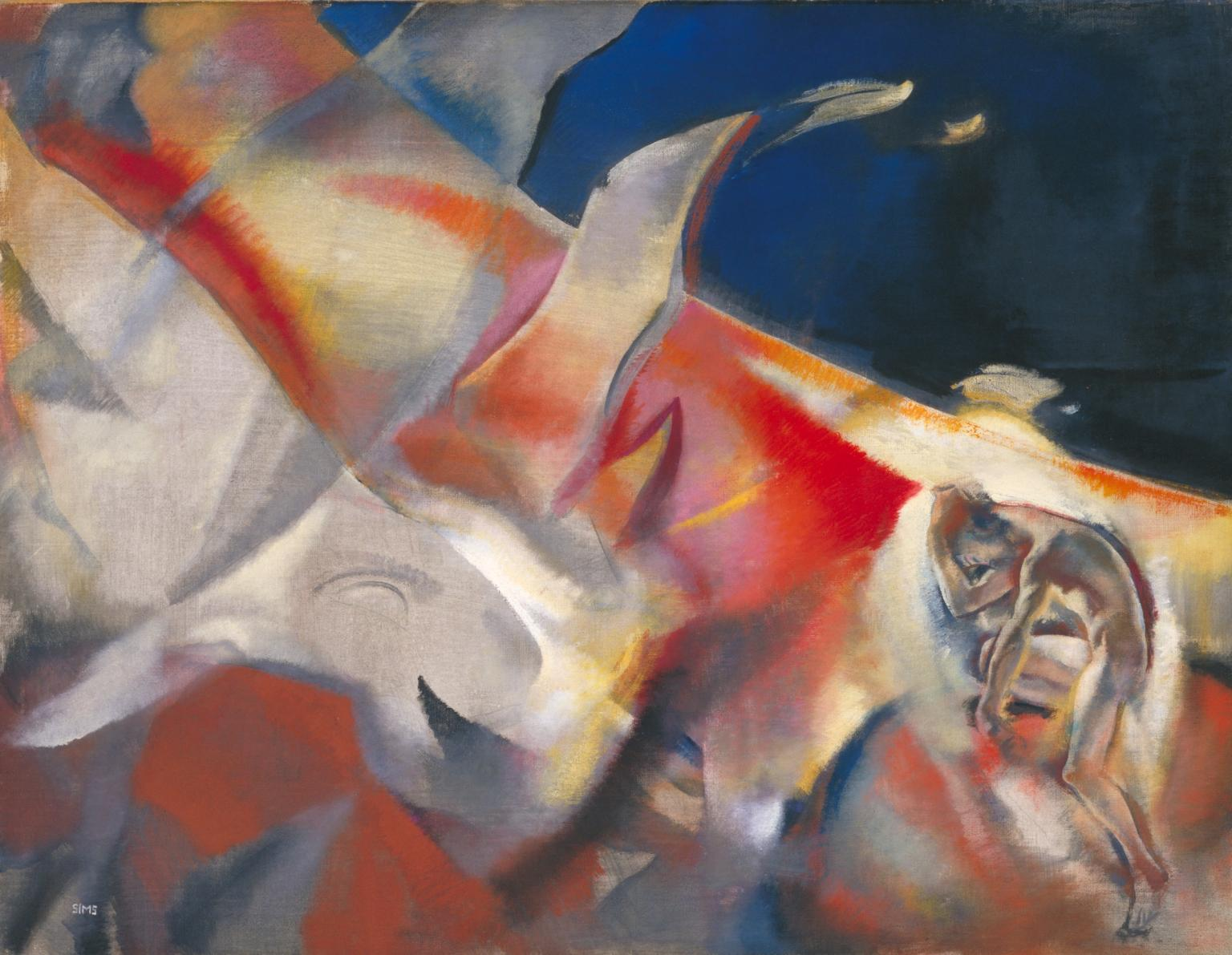
I Am the Abyss and I Am Light (1928)

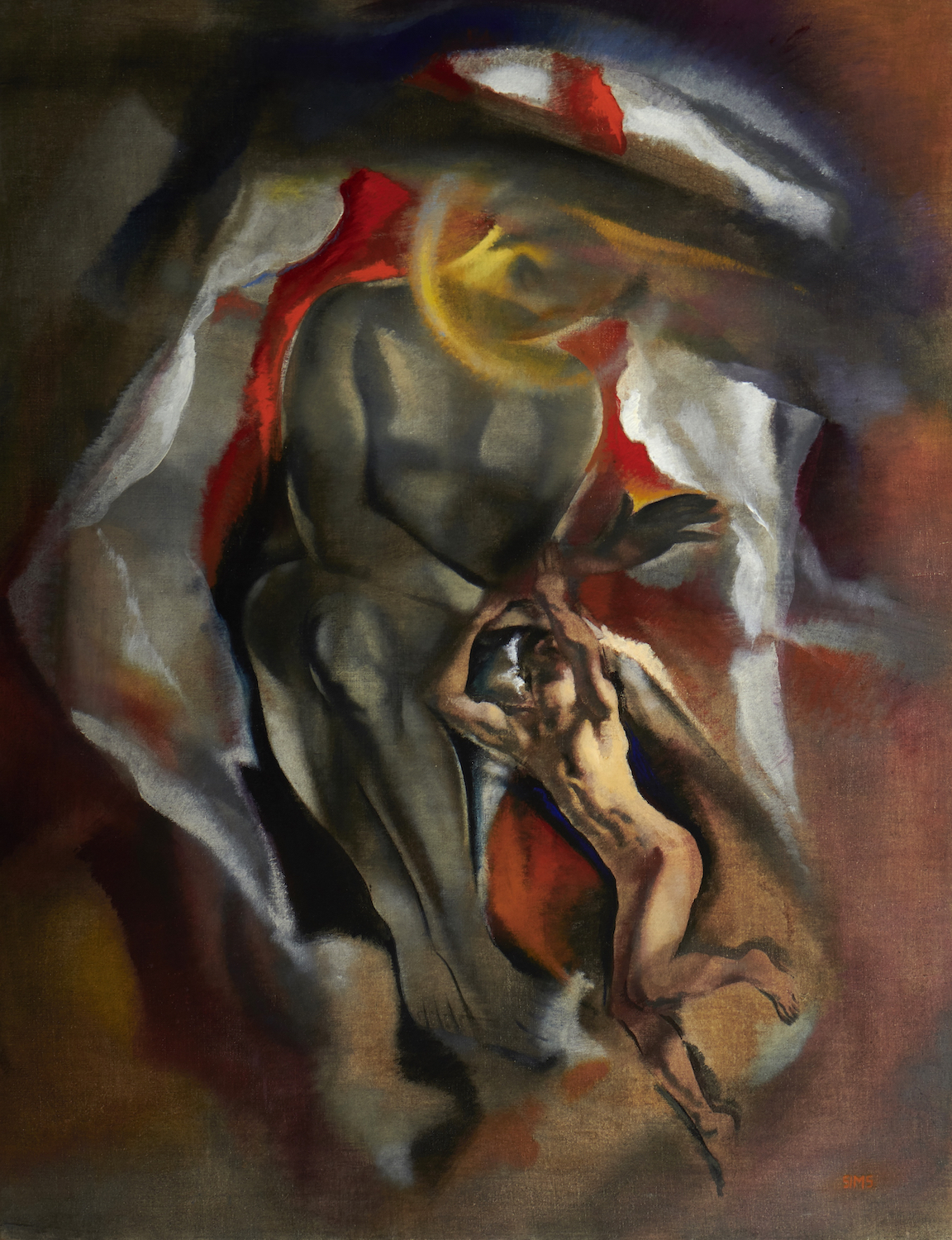
My Pain Beneath Your Sheltering Hand (c. 1928)

== Legacy ==
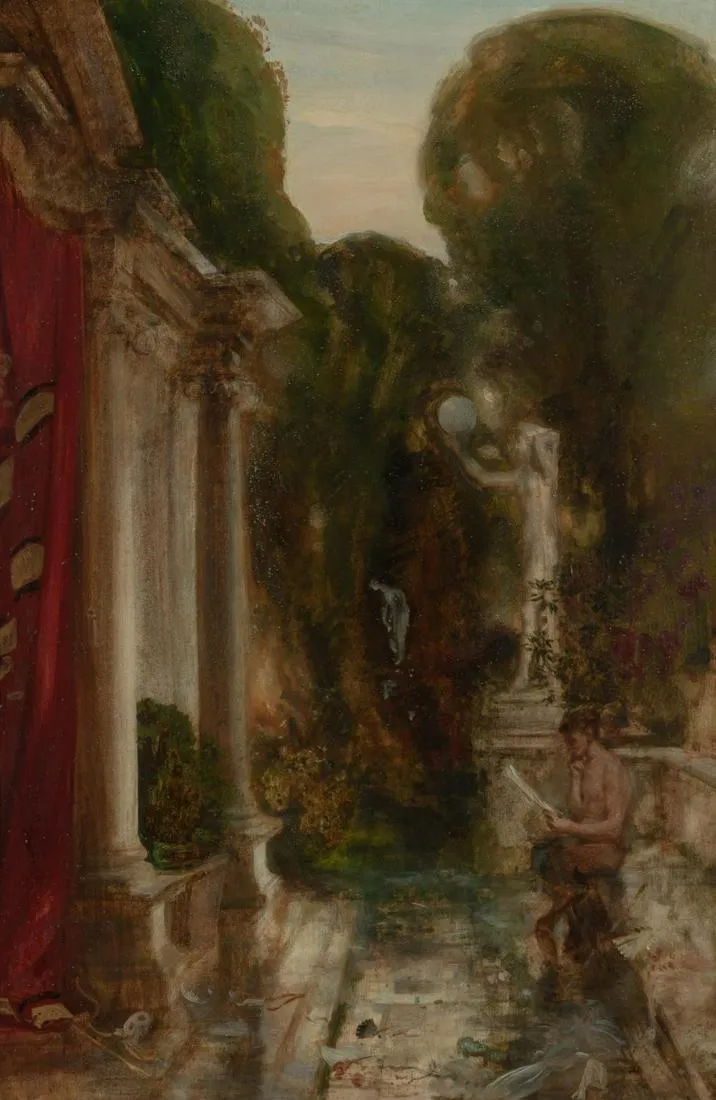
The Faun—an Epilogue (undated; private collection) was among more than 80 works by Sims exhibited by The Royal Academy in 1933; possibly a "sequel" to The Little Faun, in both cases an imaginary self-portrait of the artist, who always felt himself to be set apart because of his lameness.

In 1933, the Royal Academy presented a Commemorative Exhibition of Works by Late Members, which included over 80 works by Sims, a veritable retrospective of his career. The da Vinci expert Edward McCurdy wrote:

Sims possessed the imagination spirit to a rare degree.…He is given two rooms at Burlington House. In the one, idyllic forms are seen reveling in clear, sun-filled spaces, old myths are touched up to new meanings, or the same spirit transforms the actual.…The other [room] contains for the most part those cloudy fantasies of his later years in which his spirit seemed to be striving to express the inexpressible. He had visited the War and painted its desolation…. One may almost suppose that the phantasmagoria of memories brought something tantamount to shell-shock upon his creative powers. In the other room [one sees] much that dates from the period when his powers were at their freshest and most natural, much that one would wish to linger over and remember.…But when the mists of time have descended, and art responsive in some mysterious way to the changing environments of the human spirit has found new forms of expression, will they still satisfy without reservation any more than, let us say, the work of Sir Noel Paton does at present?

1934 saw the posthumous publication of Sims' Picture Making: Technique & Inspiration, a book "rich in insights into the theory and practice of painting." The illustrated volume also included Sims' notes on his own paintings and passages from his private journals, and a lengthy critical survey of his life and work by his son Alan Sims, making it an invaluable resource for researchers and art historians.

The early paintings that established his career, like Childhood, "showed a whimsicality fashionable in Edwardian London but ultimately detrimental to a late-twentieth-century revival of interest in his work." Nonetheless, many of his most important works remain in museum collections, and whatever the fate of his reputation, the paintings themselves were made to last. Alan Sims asserts that his father, beginning around 1909, painstakingly researched and developed a "method of painting in tempera with an oil finish" that was

the most important of his contributions to the history of British Art. By the end of his life he could claim to have retrieved the chemical formula which has enabled certain pictures to maintain indefinitely the brightness with which they left the easel, while others change hue even within the artist's memory, and are doomed to forfeit most of their original pigment at the hands of the restorer.…Charles Sims felt that a picture worth painting was worth painting for all time, on the reasonable assumption that what turns a Living Master into an Old Master is the survival-value of the paint.

Since 2005, three doctoral theses have dealt at length with Sims and his paintings. H. Cecilia Holmes' "A bright memory to remain": The Life and Works of Charles Sims RA (1873-1928), by delving into the archive of Sims' letters, diaries, and photographs at Northumbria University, creates a very human portrait of the artist. Holmes was the first scholar to suggest a connection between the remarriage of Vivienne Jeudwine and Sims' decision to commit suicide.

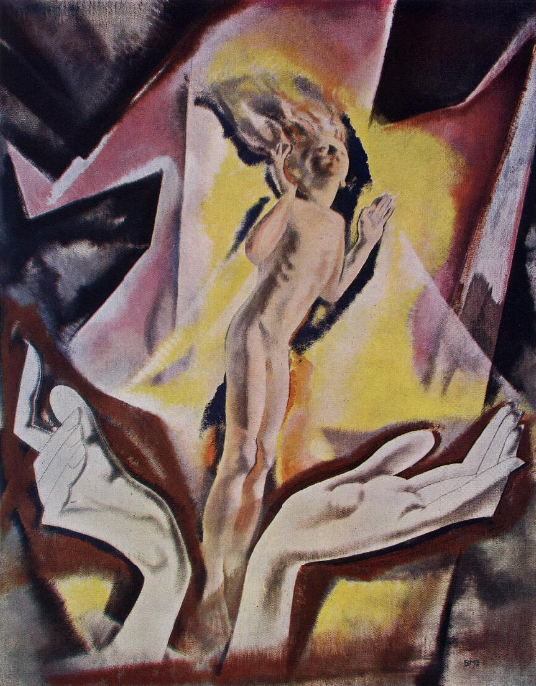
Here Am I, 1927–28, location unknown

For almost a century, Sims' legacy has been dogged by rumors of insanity. The catalogue for the 1989 exhibit The Last Romantics at the Barbican Art Gallery (which included four works by Sims) repeated the notion that his final paintings were "apparently the product of a seriously disturbed mind." The initial inclusion of Sims' work in the collection of the Bethlem Museum of the Mind was apparently due to "a belief that Sims was suffering from serious mental disorder." And in the 21st century, one gallery specializing in Outsider art has gone so far as to suggest, with no supporting evidence, that Sims had schizophrenia. Ultimately, as the Bethlem acknowledges,

At present we do not know much about his actual state of mind, but there seems little doubt that his painting was profoundly affected, both in style and content, by the mental turmoil which he was experiencing. There is no doubt at all that the most powerful and original paintings of his whole career are to be found among these final works."

Alan Sims wrote that his father's series of Spiritual Ideas was both "the greatest and last work of his life."

In 1929, when the Cleveland Museum of Art acquired Sims' Here Am I, museum curator William Mathewson Milliken wrote:

…in an agony of soul, his genius found means commensurate with his ideas. His genius, stripped of all superficial things, emerged in six mystical paintings, which are truly his last will and testament. They are his cry of pain, his de profundis. Never before throughout his life, sensitive artist that he was, had he stepped beyond a fine excellence. In those last days…he found in paint, his natural means of expression, the relief he sought—a philosophy that was sufficient, a mystic belief that would sustain. But the taut nerves could stand no more…Time alone can say the final word as to Sim's ultimate greatness. Certainly, he has no direct antecedents and can have no direct descendents.

In 1965, the Cleveland Museum of Art deaccessioned Here Am I. The present location of the painting is unknown.

== In museum collections ==
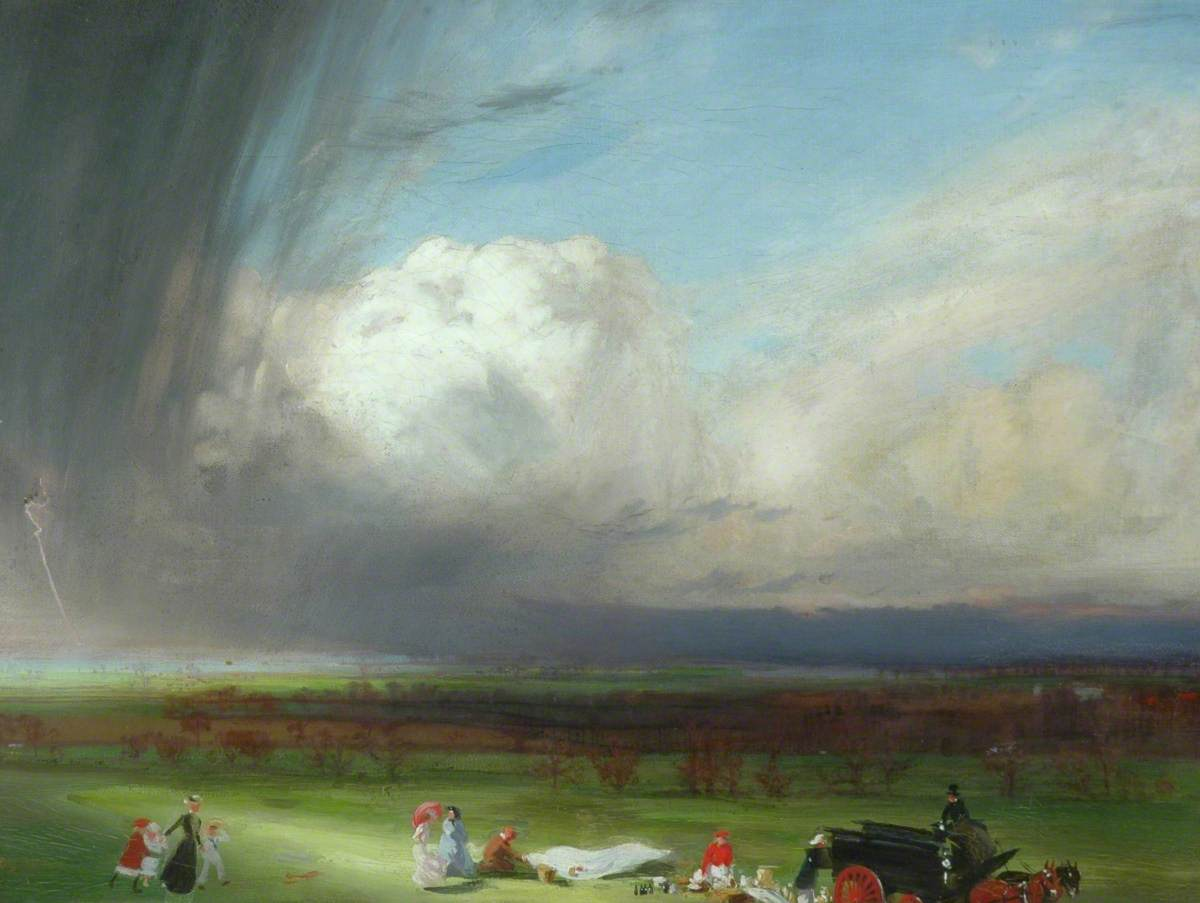
An Interrupted Picnic, 1901, Cartwright Hall.

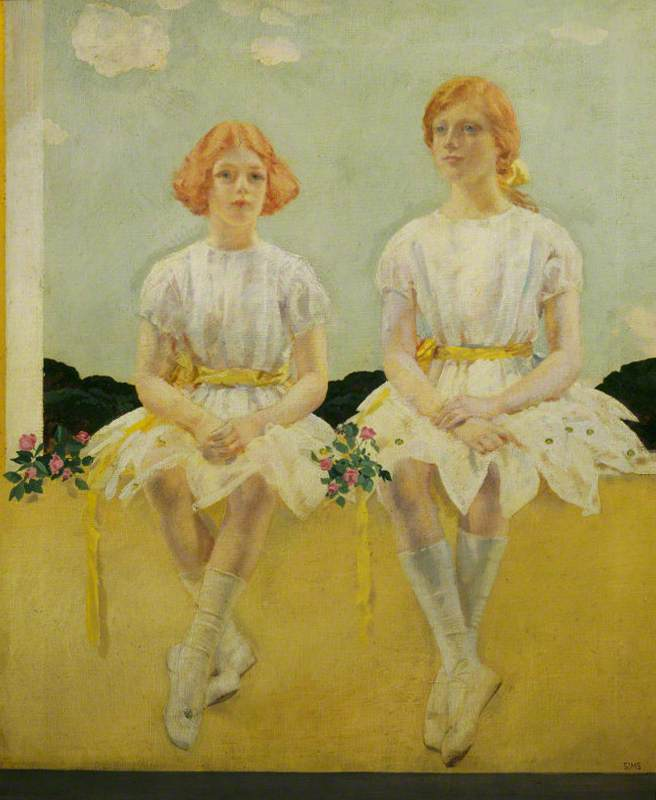
Two Girls Seated: Diana and Sarah Churchill, 1922, National Trust, Chartwell.

=== London ===
- Clio and the Children, 1913 and 1915, Royal Academy of Arts
- King John assents to Magna Carta, 1925–1927, Palace of Westminster
- The Fountain, 1907–8; The Wood Beyond the World, 1913; The Sands at Dymchurch, c.1920–2; I Am the Abyss and I Am Light, 1928, Tate
- A Camouflaged Quarry: Between Chérisy and Hendicourt, 1916; "Sacrifice": Study for the painting in Ottawa, 1918; The Land of Nod (poster), 1917, Imperial War Museums
- Dame Lilian Braithwaite, c. 1902, The Garrick Club Collections
- Portrait of a Young Man; Aspiration, 1927; Crowds of Small Souls in Flame, 1927; A Spiritual Idea, 1927; Swing; My Pain Beneath Thy Sheltering Hand, 1927, Bethlem Museum of the Mind

=== United Kingdom ===
- Two Girls Seated: Diana and Sarah Churchill, 1922, National Trust, Chartwell.
- The Little Faun, version of 1905–1906, The Fitzwilliam Museum; The Little Faun, version of 1908, Royal Cornwall Museum
- Introduction of Lady Astor as the First Woman MP, c. 1919, The Box, Plymouth
- What Are These to Me and You Who Deeply Drink of Wine?, 1895, Leeds Art Gallery
- An Interrupted Picnic, 1901, Cartwright Hall
- Man's Last Pretence of Consummation in Indifference, 1927, Ulster Museum
- George V, c. 1924, Scottish National Portrait Gallery
- Mrs. MacWhirter, City Art Centre, Edinburgh

=== Elsewhere ===
- L'Enfance (Childhood), 1897, Musée d'Orsay
- Sacrifice, c. 1918, Canadian War Museum
- Child Worship, c. 1909, Cleveland Museum of Art
- An Island Festival, 1907, Art Gallery of New South Wales
- By Summer Seas, c. 1904; Figure of a Woman c. 1905; The Death of the Year, 1910-1912, Museum of New Zealand Te Papa Tongarewa
- Bacchanalia, n.d., Hermitage Museum

== Cultural references ==
A reference to Charles Sims and his work is made in Robert Aickman's story "Ravissante," where his paintings are described: "apparently confused on the surface, even demented, they made one doubt while one continued to gaze, whether the painter had not in truth broken through to a deep and terrible order."

== At auction ==
An auction record for a work by Charles Sims was set by In Elysium, auctioned for £36,000 at Sotheby's London in 2006, then equivalent to $66,212.

== Sources ==
- "A Fairy Wooing", the 1898 painting by Charles Sims reproduced in colour with a brief essay, p. 47, Great Pictures in Private Galleries, London: Cassell and Co., Ltd., 1905.
- Baldry, A. Lys. "The Paintings of Mr. Charles Sims" (includes one colour and ten black and white reproductions) in The International Studio, issue 41, 1907, pp. 88–98.
- Bromwell, Thomas (2019). Visions of the End in Interwar British Art, Doctoral Thesis, University of York.
- Carter, A.C.R. (1898). "The Royal Academy, 1898", The Art Journal, 1898, pp. 161–184 (Sims reviewed, p. 183).
- Carter, A.C.R. (1910). "The Royal Academy, a General Survey", The Art Journal, 1910, pp. 162–170.
- "Charles Sims Resigns Royal Academy Post; Storm Over His Picture of King Is Recalled", The New York Times, 18 December 1926, p. 4.
- Colbourne, Jane Florence (2011). A Critical Survey of the Materials and Techniques of Charles Henry Sims RA (1873-1928) with Special Reference to Egg Tempera Media and Works of Art on Paper, Doctoral thesis, Northumbria University.
- "Charles Sims—Decorative, Mystical: Works in the Winter Exhibition at the Royal Academy" (full page with seven reproductions), The Illustrated London News, 14 January 1933, p. 56.
- Christian, John, editor. The Last Romantics: The Romantic Tradition in British art, Burne-Jones to Stanley Spencer, London: Lund Humphries in association with Barbican Art Gallery, 1989.
- "English Painter, Charles Sims, Dies…", The New York Times, 17 April 1928, p. 29.
- Grimsditch, H.B. "Sims, Charles (1873–1928)" in Oxford Dictionary of National Biography, Oxford University Press, 1937 (online as "archive edition").
- Hall, Susan, editor. The Edwardians: Secrets and Desires, National Gallery of Australia, 2004.
- Holmes, H. Cecilia (2005). "A bright memory to remain": The Life and Works of Charles Sims RA (1873-1928), Doctoral thesis, Northumbria University.
- Konody, P.G. "The Art of Charles Sims. R.A." in Art in Australia, no. 11, December, 1921.
- McCurdy, Edward. "Painters of Yesterday" in The Quarterly Review, Vol. 260, No. 516, April, 1933, pp. 258–259.
- Milliken, William Mathewson. "Lo, Here Am I", The Bulletin of the Cleveland Museum of Art, vol. 16, no. 3, 1929, pp. 47, 52–54.
- Reynolds, Simon. "Sims, Charles Henry (1873–1928)" in Oxford Dictionary of National Biography, Oxford University Press, 2004 (online as "current edition").
- Royal Academy of Arts (1933). Commemorative Exhibition of Works by Late Members, Winter Exhibition, Fifty-Second Year, 1933.
- Rutter, Frank. "The Academy," The Sunday Times, 8 May 1928.
- Seel, Graham. "The Artist and the King", History Today, vol. 65, issue 7, July 2015, pp. 39–44.
- Sims, Charles. Picture Making: Technique & Inspiration (with a critical survey of his life & work by Alan Sims), The New Art Library (Second Series), London: Seeley Service & Co., 1934.
- Speed, Harold. "Charles Sims, R.A." in The Old Water-Colour Society's Club, Vol. 6 (1928-1929), London, 1929, pp. 45–64; a self-portrait of Sims faces p. 46.
- "Suicide's Pictures Make London Gasp; Six Weird Paintings by Charles Sims at Royal Academy Exhibit Symbolize Pain…", The New York Times, 5 May 1928, p. 5.
- Valentine. Helen. "1916: Altered States" in The Royal Academy of Arts Summer Exhibition: A Chronicle, 1769–2018, edited by Mark Hallett, Sarah Victoria Turner and Jessica Feather, London: Paul Mellon Centre for Studies in British Art, 2018.
- Wilcox, Timothy. "1928: The Agony and Ecstasy of Charles Sims" in The Royal Academy of Arts Summer Exhibition: A Chronicle, 1769–2018, edited by Mark Hallett, Sarah Victoria Turner and Jessica Feather, London: Paul Mellon Centre for Studies in British Art, 2018.
- "The World of Art…Exhibition of Paintings by Charles Sims", The New York Times, 4 October 1925, Section SM, pp. 14–15.
