= Western Cattle in Storm =

American postage stamp

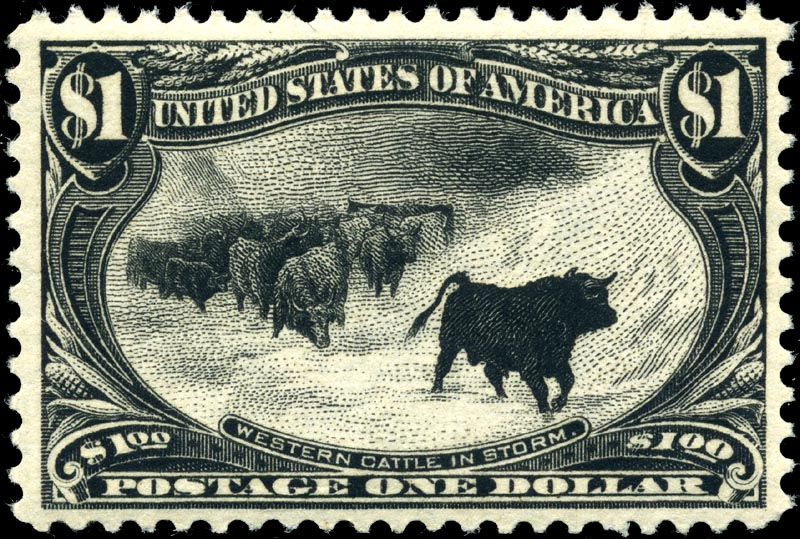
- Country of issue: United States
- Country of production: United States
- Location of production: Washington, D.C.
- Date of issue: June 17, 1898
- Designer: Raymond Ostrander Smith
- Engraver: Marcus W. Baldwin & Douglas S. Ronaldson
- Printer: Bureau of Engraving and Printing
- Commemorates: Trans-Mississippi Exposition
- Depicts: John MacWhirter's The Vanguard
- No. printed: 57,000, 56,900 issued to post offices
- Face value: $1
- Estimated value: Used: $265-$500; Fine mint $1,700-$3,000

Western Cattle in Storm is a $1 stamp issued by the United States Post Office Department as part of the 1898 Trans-Mississippi Issue. Western Cattle in Storm is one of nine commemorative postage stamps in the series, which marked the 1898 Trans-Mississippi Exposition held in Omaha, Nebraska. While the entire Trans-Mississippi Issue set has been praised for its quality, viewed by generations of U. S. stamp specialists as "one of the most beautiful sets of postage stamps our country has ever issued," the $1 stamp, also called the Black Bull, stands out from the rest.

The breed of cattle used in the issue were meant to represent the ruggedness of the American West, but actually derive from the Highlands of Scotland. That's because the design originated in a John MacWhirter painting (1878) depicting cattle in a winter storm in central Scotland. An engraving of this painting by one C. O. Murray was published at least twice in England, and this image, copied, without the permission of the painting's owner, Lord Blythswood, was used by an American cattle company on its calendar as a trademark of sorts.

"MacWhirter, however, was a Scot, and his painting, entitled The Vanguard, was soon discovered to have been a depiction of Scottish cattle in a storm in Scotland," according to a company called Chicago Stamps. "It was actually painted in a small farmhouse near the Scottish highland town of Calendar. The scene did not depict an event west of the Mississippi, but it might have been, and few really cared about this detail, for cattle were an important part of the western U.S. economy." (Note: the correct spelling of the town is Callander.)

This image caught the attention of the Post Office Department and Raymond Ostrander Smith, the staff designer of the Bureau of Engraving and Printing at the time, and it was adopted for the $1 design. Little did the designer know that the scene depicted was in Scotland, not the Western U.S., as was supposed. A full apology was later issued to the owner of the painting. Both the frame and the vignette of the stamp were engraved by Marcus W. Baldwin; the numerals and lettering were the work of Douglas S. Ronaldson.

== Production and printing ==
Ironically, the feature that gives this stamp its singular distinction and beauty, its coal-black color, was decided upon only a few days before the issue went to press; previous versions seen in surviving essays are far less dramatic in appearance. The $1 stamp and the eight others in the Trans-Mississippi series were originally to be two-toned, with all the vignettes printed in black and the various frames printed in different colors. In preliminary bi-color die essays, a brownish-purple frame surrounds the cattle herd. However, after the outbreak of the Spanish–American War in April, the Bureau of Engraving and Printing found its resources severely overtaxed by the need for additional revenue stamps, and so, elected to simplify the printing process for the Trans-Mississippi series by issuing the stamps in single colors. The color initially chosen for the $1 value, announced by the Post Office on May 16, was light brown. Only on May 26, four days before printing began, did the public learn that the denomination would instead be printed with black ink.

The entire printing run of Western Cattle in Storm lasted three days, from June 1–3, 1898. In all, the Bureau of Engraving and Printing shipped 56,900 copies of the stamp to post offices.

== Distribution ==
The earliest known date of delivery to postmasters of stamps of the Trans-Mississippi Issue is June 15, 1898. The assigned first day of issue was June 17. There had been considerable pre-issue publicity regarding the series, which resulted in an early rush on the initial limited supplies available at post offices. But such interest was short-lived, especially as post offices replenished their stocks, the novelty of the new stamps wore off, and speculative interest waned. On December 31, 1898, the sale of stamps to postmasters was discontinued. Afterward, an unknown quantity of unsold stamps were destroyed.

Prior to the issuance of the $1 Western Cattle in Storm, only two other $1 US postage stamps had ever been printed and released: the $1 Columbian Exposition stamp issued in 1893 and titled Isabella Pledging Her Jewels (see File:Columbian241-1$.jpg) and the $1 Oliver Hazard Perry (see File:Perry 1894 Issue-1$.jpg) issued in 1894.

== Appraisal ==
While today Western Cattle in Storm is regarded as one of the most attractive U.S. stamps ever produced, there have been detractors. John Luff, one of the most influential philatelic writers of his day, apparently did not think much of the stamp or others in the series, according to Chicago Stamps. "The stamps are poorly conceived and executed, overloaded with ornaments, heavy in color and blurred in printing," he wrote in 1902.

But by 1933, author Ralph Kimble described the Trans-Mississippi stamps as "perhaps the most attractive set of commemoratives which we have ever had," adding additional flattery for the $1 stamp. In 1934, Stamps magazine asked readers to vote on the most beautiful stamp in the world. The Canadian 1928 50¢ Bluenose stamp won first place with Western Cattle in Storm placing second.

Today, pristine copies of Western Cattle in Storm can sell for tens of thousands of dollars.

== Reissue ==
In 1998, the nine stamps of the Trans-Mississippi Issue were all reissued on a souvenir sheet by the U.S. Postal Service, along with a separate souvenir sheet containing nine copies of "Western Cattle in Storm." Unlike in 1898, the 1998 versions were issued in two colors.

== References and sources ==
Notes

Sources

- Lester G. Brookman, The Nineteenth Century Postage Stamps of the United States (Lindquist, 1947).
- John N. Luff and Benno Loewy, The Postage Stamps of the United States (New York, Scott Stamp & Coin Co., 1902).
