= John MacWhirter =

Scottish painter (1839–1911)

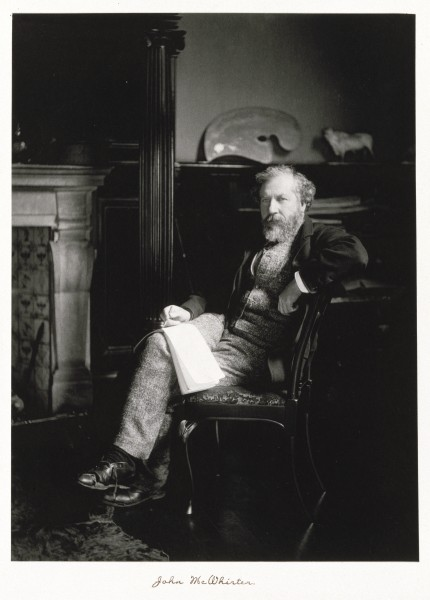
Photographic portrait of John MacWhirter (between circa 1889 and circa 1891)

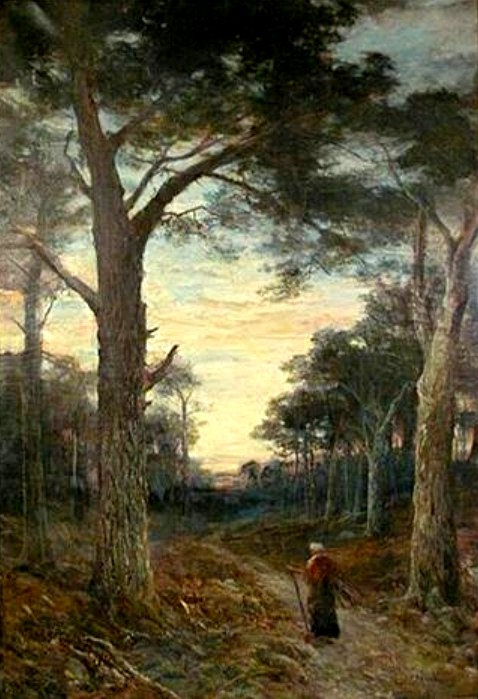
The Gates of the Forest, 1910 (Royal Academy)

John MacWhirter RA (27 March 1839 in Slateford, Edinburgh - 28 January 1911 in London) was a Scottish landscape painter.

== Biography ==
John was the third of four children. One of his elder sisters, Agnes MacWhirter was also a noted artist of still lifes. He attended a school in Colinton, and after his father's death was apprenticed to Oliver & Boyd, booksellers in Edinburgh. He stayed there for only a few months and then in 1851 enrolled at the Trustees Academy under Robert Scott Lauder and John Ballantyne (1815–97). He spent long periods sketching and studying nature outdoors. His first painting to be exhibited at the Royal Scottish Academy at age 14, was 'Old Cottage at Braid'. In 1880, he was made an Honorary Member of the Royal Scottish Academy. Exploring and painting abroad he visited Italy, Sicily, Switzerland, Austria, Turkey, Norway and the U.S.A. - the Alps being a great inspiration. He moved to London in 1867 and on 4 May 1893 was elected a Royal Academician.

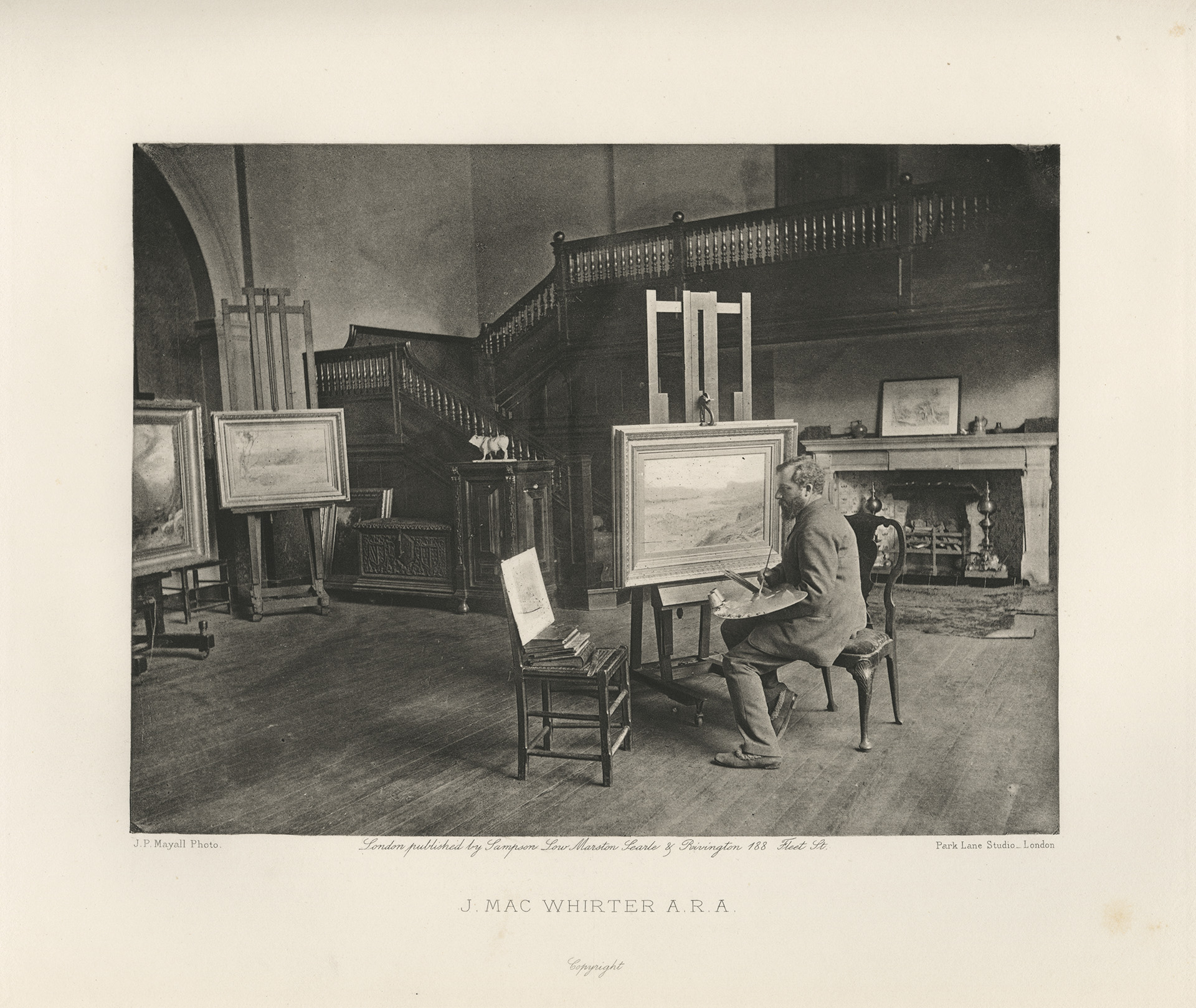
MacWhirter by J. P. Mayall from “Artists at Home,” published 1884, Department of Image Collections, National Gallery of Art Library, Washington, DC

MacWhirter specialised in romantic landscapes with a great fondness for trees, spending much time in the hilly countryside of Perthshire. Initially, under the influence of John Everett Millais, he experimented with the detailed images of the Pre-Raphaelites, but later adopted a more sweeping style. With John Pettie he illustrated Wordsworth's Poetry for the Young (Strahan, 1863). With Waller H. Paton and others, MacWhirter illustrated The Poetical Works of Edgar Allan Poe (Hislop, 1869).

== Family ==
He married Catherine ('Katie') Cowan Menzies (b. 1843) in 1872, her brother-in-law the Rev. James McFarlan officiating. The couple lived at 1 Abbey Road, St. John's Wood in the 1870s, and had two daughters and two sons:

1. Agnes Helen ('Nan') *1873 who married the artist Charles Sims
2. Helen Agnes *1875 x Sydney Malcolm Baird
3. Ulric George *1878
4. Alan Gordon *1882 x Doris May Cook

MacWhirter has paintings in several British collections including Royal Holloway University of London, The Wilson, Cheltenham and Derby Museum and Art Gallery.

== Bibliography ==
- MacWhirter, John Landscape Painting in Water-colour (London, Cassell), 1900
- Sinclair, W. M. John MacWhirter, R.A. : his life and work (The Art Annual), 1903
- MacWhirter, John The MacWhirter sketch book (Philadelphia, Lippincott), 1907; (London, Cassell), 1908

== See also ==
- Western Cattle in Storm
