= 1882 in art =

Events from the year 1882 in art.

== Events ==
- March 1 – Seventh Impressionist exhibition in Paris opens at 251 rue Saint-Honoré.
- April 9 – English poet and artist Dante Gabriel Rossetti dies aged 53 of Bright's disease at Birchington-on-Sea in the care of his brother, the critic William Michael Rossetti.
- May 1 – The Salon of 1882 opens at the Palace of Industry in Paris
- May 1 – The Royal Academy Exhibition of 1882 opens at Burlington House in London
- August – Vincent van Gogh starts painting in oil on the sea coast at Scheveningen, sponsored by his brother Theo.
- Walter Langley moves to Newlyn on the coast of Cornwall, becoming the first resident artist of the Newlyn School.
- The gallery of botanical illustrations made and donated by Marianne North is opened at the Royal Botanic Gardens, Kew, the first permanent solo exhibition by a female artist in Britain.
- The Royal Manchester Institution transfers its galleries and collections to Manchester Corporation (England) as Manchester Art Gallery.
- The Jones Bequest is made to the Victoria and Albert Museum in London by the art collector John Jones

== Works ==
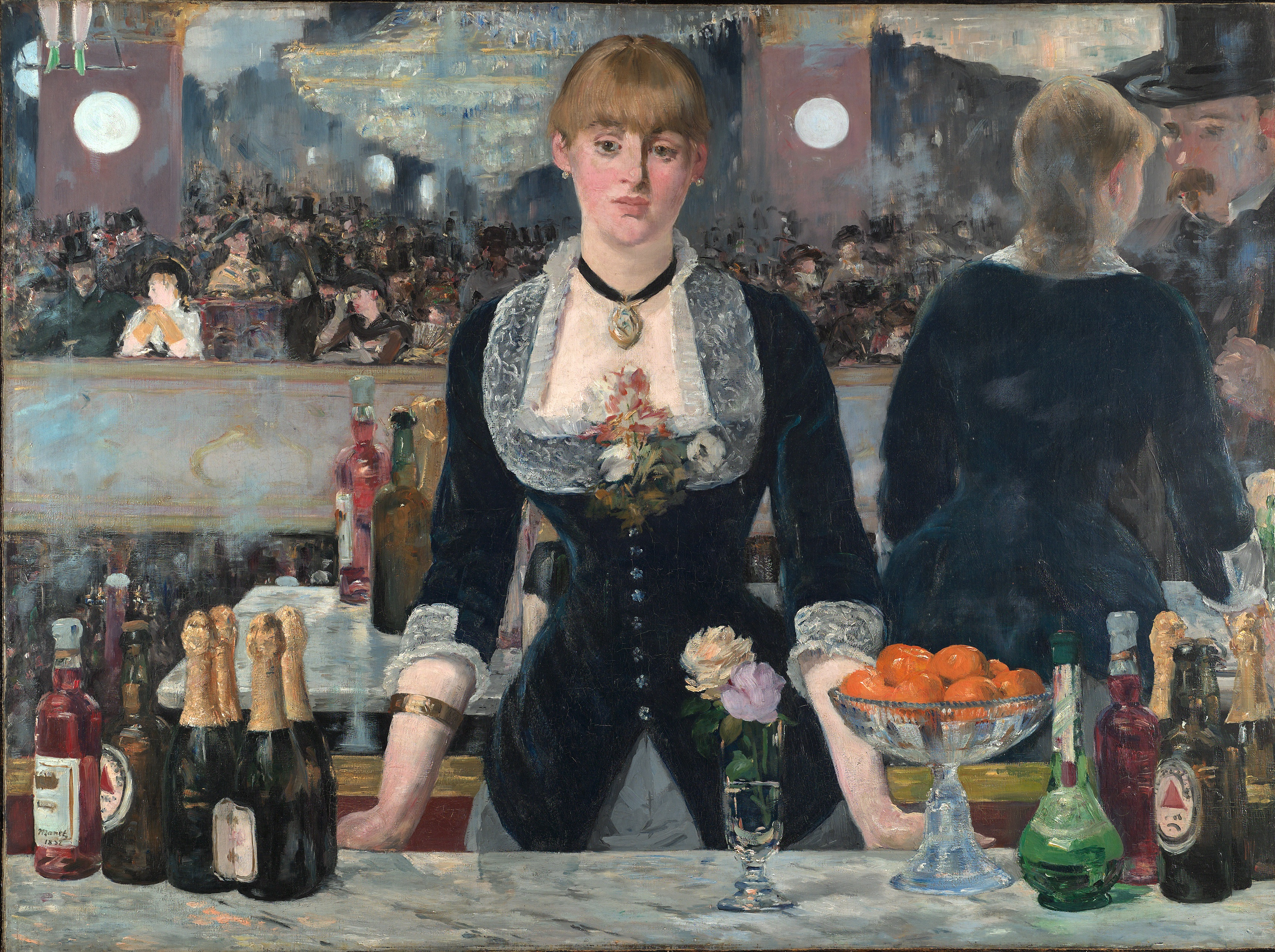
Manet – A Bar at the Folies-Bergère

- Marie Bashkirtseff – Head of a Woman
- Edward Burne-Jones – The Mill (1870–82; Victoria and Albert Museum, London)
- Edward Burne-Jones and William Morris – David's Charge to Solomon (stained-glass window, Trinity Church, Boston, Massachusetts)
- Gustave Caillebotte
  - Fruits on a stand
  - Yellow Roses in a Vase
- Paul Cézanne – Mont Sainte-Victoire and the Viaduct of the Arc River Valley
- William Merritt Chase
  - Azaleas
  - In the Studio
- John Collier – Clytemnestra (Guildhall Art Gallery, City of London)
- Pierre Puvis de Chavannes – The Happy Land
- Henry Treffry Dunn – Rossetti and Watts-Dunton at 16 Cheyne Walk
- Frank Duveneck – Mary Cabot Wheelwright
- Nikolai Ge – Leo Tolstoy
- Aleksander Gierymski – In the Arbour
- Atkinson Grimshaw
  - Late October
  - Under the Moonbeams
  - View of Heath Street by Night
- William Halsall – Mayflower in Plymouth Harbor
- William Henry Holmes – Panorama from Point Sublime, looking East; The Grand Cañon at the foot of the Toroweap and The Temples and Towers of the Virgen (illustrations to Clarence Dutton's Tertiary History of the Grand Cañon District published by the United States Geological Survey)
- Paul Jamin – The Death of the Prince Imperial
- Christian Krohg – Portrait of the Swedish Painter Karl Nordström
- P. S. Krøyer – Frederikke Tuxen
- Benjamin Williams Leader
  - In the evening it shall be light
  - Sunshine after Rain
- Wilhelm Leibl – Three Women in Church (Kunsthalle Hamburg)
- Konstantin Makovsky – Portrait of the Artist's Children
- Édouard Manet – A Bar at the Folies-Bergère
- Jan Matejko – Prussian Homage
- Albert Joseph Moore – Dreamers
- Thomas Moran – Nearing Camp, Evening on the Upper Colorado River, Wyoming
- Frank O'Meara – Reverie
- John Pettie – The Duke of Monmouth's Interview with James II
- Pierre Renoir – Blonde Bather (second version)
- Georges Rochegrosse - The Emperor Vitellius Dragged through the Streets of Rome by the People
- Auguste Rodin – The Kiss (marble sculpture, original version, as Francesca da Rimini)
- John Singer Sargent
  - Lady with the Rose (Charlotte Louise Burckhardt)
  - Portraits d'enfants (The Daughters of Edward Darley Boit)
- Joseph-Noël Sylvestre – The Gaul Ducar decapitates the Roman general Flaminus at the Battle of Trasimene
- James Tissot – The Garden Bench
- Vincent van Gogh
  - Adrianus Jacobus Zuyderland series of drawings
  - Sien series of drawings, including Sorrow
  - Lying Cow (two paintings – probable date)
- Viktor Vasnetsov – Sergius of Radonezh (icon for church at Abramtsevo Colony)
- John William Waterhouse – Diogenes
- William Frederick Yeames – Prince Arthur and Hubert de Burgh

== Births ==
- January 15 – Daniel Vázquez Díaz, Spanish painter (died 1969)
- January 18 (January 6 OS) – Aleksandra Ekster, born Aleksandra Aleksandrovna Grigorovich, Russian-Ukrainian painter (Cubo-Futurist, Suprematist, Constructivist) and designer (died 1949)
- February 12 – Ljubomir Ivanović, Serbian painter (died 1945)
- March 3 – Fritz Burger-Mühlfeld, German painter (died 1969)
- April 2 – Estella Solomons, Irish painter (died 1968).
- April 16 – André Edouard Marty, French artist (died 1974)
- May 5 – Sylvia Pankhurst, English-born suffragette and artist (died 1960)
- May 13 – Georges Braque, French painter and sculptor (died 1963)
- June 1 – Signe Hammarsten-Jansson, Swedish graphic artist (died 1970)
- June 4 – John Bauer, Swedish illustrator (died 1918)
- June 11 – Alvin Langdon Coburn, American-born pictorialist photographer (died 1966)
- June 21 – Rockwell Kent, American painter, printmaker, illustrator and writer (died 1971)
- July 22 – Edward Hopper, American painter and printmaker (died 1967)
- August 14 – Gisela Richter, English archaeologist and art historian (died 1972)
- August – George Bellows, American painter (died 1925)
- October 3
  - Auguste Chabaud, French painter (died 1955)
  - A. Y. Jackson, Canadian painter (died 1974)
- October 10 – Lazar Drljača, Serbian painter (died 1970)
- October 19 – Umberto Boccioni, Italian Futurist painter and sculptor (died 1916)
- November 2 – Frederick Farrell, Scottish watercolourist, war artist (died 1935)
- November 18 – Wyndham Lewis, Nova Scotia-born English Vorticist painter and writer (died 1957)
- December 28 – Lili Elbe, born Einar Magnus Andreas Wegener, Danish-born artist (died 1931)
- Undated – Todor Švrakić, Serbian painter (died 1931)

== Deaths ==
- January 14 – Timothy H. O'Sullivan, American Civil War photographer (born 1840)
- January 20
  - John Linnell, English landscape painter (born 1792)
  - William Miller, Scottish Quaker engraver (born 1796)
- February 7 – Édouard De Bièfve, Belgian painter (born 1808)
- March 30 – Henri Lehmann, German-born French painter (born 1814)
- April 10 – Dante Gabriel Rossetti, English Pre-Raphaelite painter (born 1828)
- April 18 – Elizabeth Goodridge, American miniature painter (born 1798)
- May 20 – Pietro Boyesen, Danish-born photographer (born 1819)
- June 3 – Christian Wilberg, German painter (born 1839)
- June 20 – Auguste François Biard, French genre painter (born 1799)
- July 8 – Hablot Knight Browne ("Phiz"), English illustrator (born 1815)
- July 9 – Louis-Charles Verwee, Belgian painter (born 1832)
- August 14 – Niels Christian Kierkegaard, Danish draftsman and lithographer (born 1806)
- August 29 – Johann Halbig, German sculptor (born 1814)
- September 22 – Katarina Ivanović, Serbian painter (born 1811)
- September 23 – John Wharlton Bunney, English topographical painter (born 1828)
- October 25 – Emma Stebbins, American sculptor (born 1815)
- November 7 – Julius Hübner, German genre painter (born 1806)
- Unknown date
  - James Eights, American scientist and watercolour painter (born 1798)
  - George Hollingsworth, American painter (born 1813)
