= 1969 in art =

Events from the year 1969 in art.

== Events ==
- February 2 – Ten paintings are defaced in New York's Metropolitan Museum of Art.
- August 8 – Iain Macmillan photographs the cover picture for The Beatles' album Abbey Road in London.
- October 5 – Monty Python's Flying Circus is broadcast for the first time on BBC Television, with Terry Gilliam's animations.
- October 18 – Caravaggio's Nativity with St. Francis and St. Lawrence (c.1609) is stolen from its frame in the Oratory of Saint Lawrence in Palermo, Sicily; it has not been recovered as of 2020.
- November 19 – The Apollo 12 lunar module lands on the Moon with astronaut and artist Alan Bean; American artist Forrest "Frosty" Myers claims to have smuggled the art piece Moon Museum onto a leg of the module which will remain on the surface.
- c. December – The music and performance art collective COUM Transmissions is formed in England by Genesis P-Orridge.
- Late – Andy Warhol, John Wilcock, and Gerard Malanga co-found the magazine Interview.
- Opening of the Oakland Museum of California, designed by Kevin Roche.

== Exhibitions ==
- January 9 – In Washington, D.C., the Smithsonian Institution displays the art of Winslow Homer for 6 weeks.
- December 19 - The exhibition Alvin Loving: Psintings opens at the Whitney Museum of American Art in New York City marking the frst solo exhibition given to a black artist in the institution's history.
- Most of the paintings from the following year's "Lyrical Abstraction" exhibition are displayed at the Aldrich Contemporary Art Museum, marking a significant return to expressivity in American abstract painting. For two years the exhibition travels throughout the U.S. including to the Whitney Museum of American Art in New York City.

== Awards ==
- Archibald Prize: Ray Crooke – George Johnston
- John Moores Painting Prize - Richard Hamilton and Mary Martin for "Toaster" and "Cross" (respectively)

== Works ==
- Kenojuak Ashevak – The Owl
- Michael Ayrton – The Arkville Minotaur
- Francis Bacon – Three Studies of Lucian Freud
- Thomas Bass – Australian Seal (bronze, Washington, D.C.)
- Edward Bawden – Victoria tile motif on London Underground's Victoria line
- Fernando Botero – Protestant Family
- Alexander Calder – La Grande Vitesse (sculpture)
- Christo and Jeanne Claude – "Wrapped Coast" in Little Bay, Sydney, New South Wales, Australia
- Mai Dantsig – Partisan Ballad
- Melvin Edwards – Curtain for William and Peter (sculpture)
- M. C. Escher – Snakes (woodcut print)
- Helen Frankenthaler – Slice of Stone Itself
- Frank Frazetta – Egyptian Queen
- Milton Glaser – Speed City
- Anna Hyatt Huntington – Equestrian statue of Israel Putnam at Putnam Memorial State Park in Redding, Connecticut (dedicated)
- Jess Collins – If All the World Were Paper and All the Water Sink
- Allen Jones – Hatstand, Table and Chair (sculptures)
- Ronnie Landfield – Diamond Lake
- André Lufwa – "Batteur de tam-tam"
- Joan Mitchell – Sans Neige
- Danuta Nabel-Bochenek, Kazimierz Łaskawski – American Astronauts Memorial (sculpture, Kraków, Poland)
- Shalom Tomáš Neuman - Classical Myth (mixed media, painting, and sculpture)
- Kanda Nissho – Snow Farm
- Pablo Picasso – The Kiss
- Enzo Plazzotta – Baigneuse
- Jean-Paul Riopelle – La Joute (public sculptural installation, Montreal)
- Will Roberts – Redberth Village, Pembrokeshire
- Alexander Semionov – Leningrad in the Morning
- Victor Teterin – Sredne-Podjacheskaya Street in Leningrad
- Nikolai Timkov – Russian Winter
- Hans Unger – Oxford Circus and Green Park tile motifs on London Underground's Victoria line

== Exhibitions ==
- December 30 until March 1, 1970 - Spaces at the Museum of Modern Art in New York City (Dan Flavin, Larry Bell, Robert Morris, Franz Erhard Walther, and Pulsa).

== Births ==
- January 5 – Marilyn Manson, American rock musician and painter
- February 7 – Andrew Micallef, Maltese painter and musician
- July 11 – Abigail McLellan, British painter (d. 2009)
- October 5 – Chantal Joffe, English painter
- November 26 – Kara Walker, African American artist
- date unknown
  - Boushra Almutawakel, Yemeni photographer
  - Steven Claydon, English sculptor, installation artist and musician
  - Invader, French urban artist
  - Patricia Martín, Mexican curator

== Deaths ==
- January 20 – Luigi Del Bianco, Italian-born American sculptor (b. 1892)
- January 29 – Edward Marshall Boehm, American Expressionist sculptor (b. 1913)
- March 14 – Ben Shahn, Lithuanian-born American painter and photographer (b. 1898)
- March 17 – Daniel Vázquez Díaz, Spanish painter (b. 1882)
- May 11 – T. K. Padmini, Keralan feminist painter (b. 1940; d. in childbirth)
- May 17 – Fritz Burger-Mühlfeld, German painter (b. 1882)
- June 12 – Aleksandr Deyneka, Russian painter and sculptor (b. 1899)
- July 5 – Walter Gropius, German-born architect (b. 1883)
- July 9 – Emerik Feješ, Hungarian and Serbian painter (b. 1904)
- July 25 – Otto Dix, German painter and printmaker (b. 1891)
- August – Doris Brabham Hatt, English modernist painter (b. 1890)
- September 15 – Edith Barry, American sculptor, painter, illustrator and designer (b. 1883)
- November 21 – Norman Lindsay, Australian sculptor and cartoonist (born 1879)

== See also ==
- 1969 in fine arts of the Soviet Union
