= RSW =

RSW may refer to:

- The IATA airport code for Southwest Florida International Airport
- Registered social worker
- Raleigh RSW 16
- Rogers Sportsnet West
- Renegade Soundwave, electronic music group
- The Royal Scottish Society of Painters in Watercolour
- Resistance Spot Welding
- RSW "Prasa-Książka-Ruch" newspaper monopoly in communist Poland
- Refrigerated Sea Water
