= American Astronauts Memorial =

Former sculpture in Kraków, Poland

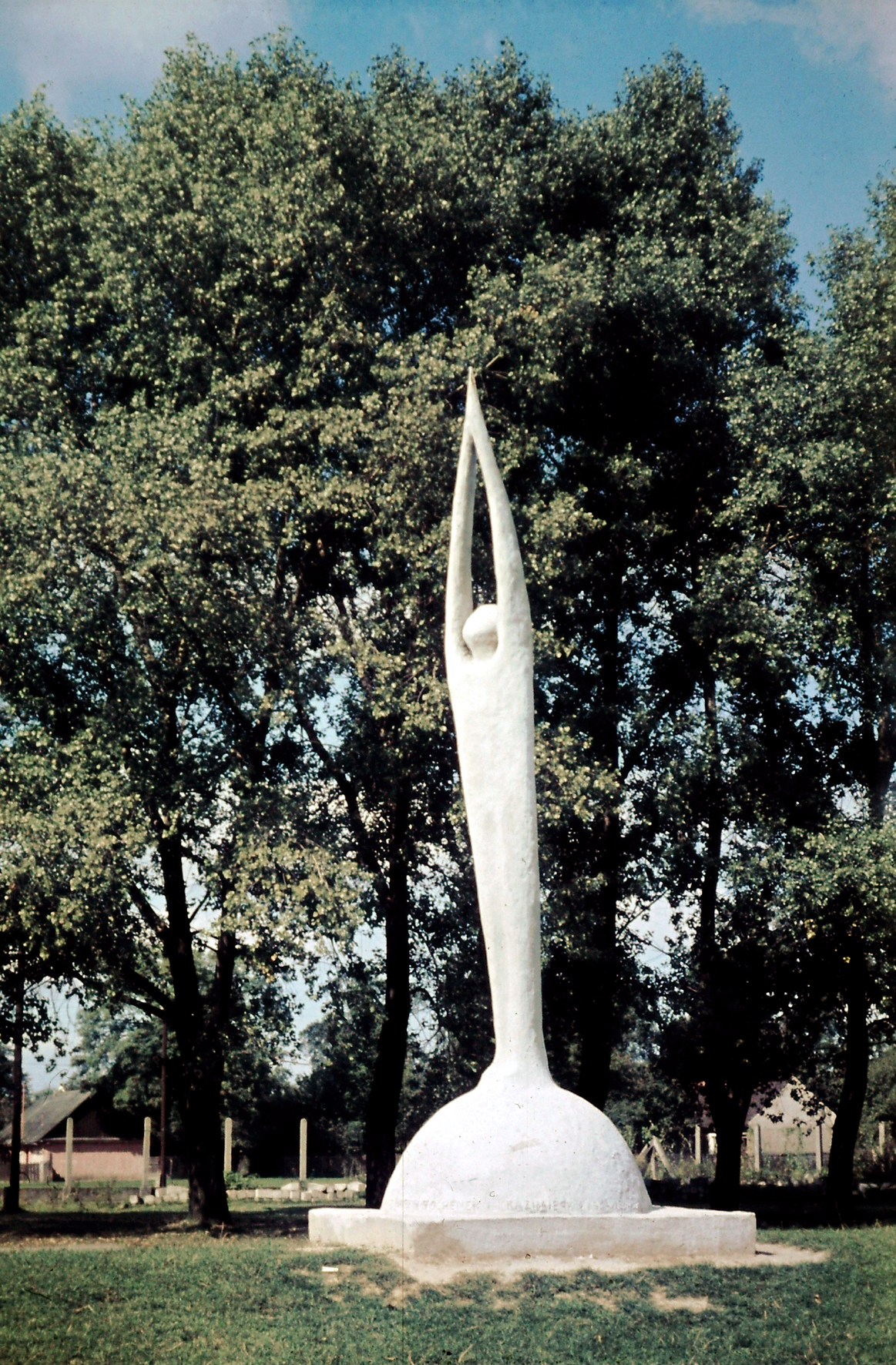
- The sculpture c. 20 July 1969.
- Interactive map of American Astronauts Memorial
- Location: 124A Zarzecze Street, Kraków, Poland
- Coordinates: 50°04′31″N 19°52′56″E
- Designer: Danuta Nabel-Bochenek (designer and sculptor); Kazimierz Łaskawski (sculptor)
- Type: Sculpture
- Material: Concrete
- Height: 8 m (26,25 ft.)
- Opening date: 20 July 1969
- Dedicated to: Apollo 11
- Dismantled date: October 1969

The American Astronauts Memorial (Polish: Pomnik Astronautów Amerykańskich) was a modernist sculpture in Kraków, Poland. It was placed in the Bronowianka sports club complex at 124A Zarzecze Street, within the district of Bronowice. Unveiled on 20 July 1969, on the day of the landing on the Moon by the Apollo 11 mission, it became the first monument in the world dedicated to its crew, consisting of Neil Armstrong, Buzz Aldrin, and Michael Collins. It was designed by Danuta Nabel-Bochenek, and crafted by her together with Kazimierz Łaskawski. The monument caused controversies among members of both the Polish United Workers' Party and Communist Party of the Soviet Union over the celebration of the American success in the Space Race, and was removed and subsequently destroyed by the authorities in late October 1969.

== History ==
The sculpture was proposed and approved in February 1969, during a meeting of the Bronowianka sports club management, to celebrate the upcoming 25th anniversary of the Polish People's Republic on 22 July. Originally named the Athletes Memorial, its concept was soon changed to the American Astronauts Memorial, in honour to Neil Armstrong, Buzz Aldrin, and Michael Collins, the crew of Apollo 11, an upcoming mission with goal of landing first humans on the Moon. It was designed by Danuta Nabel-Bochenek, and crafted by her together with Kazimierz Łaskawski. It was made in one of the buildings of the Bronowianka sports club complex, with materials being provided by company Krakowskie Przedsiębiorstwo Budownictwa Przemysłowego.

The monument was placed next to the club's assosiasion football pitch, and unveiled in the afternoon on 20 July 1969, on the day of the first lunar landing by the Apollo 11. The ceremony was attended by several people, including the members of the sports club, and the local government of the Bronowice district in Kraków. A photography of the event, made by a journalist of the Central Photographic Agency, was published the next day in the 171st issue of newspaper Gazeta Krakowska. Soon after, it was quoted by other international publications such as The New York Times in the United States, and Der Spiegel in Germany.

In response to the publicity garnered by the statue, Władysław Gomułka, the First Secretary of the Central Committee of the Polish United Workers' Party, the de facto leader of Poland, received two telegram messages. First, from Ronald Reagan, the President of the United States, thanking for the "commemoration of the American astronauts", and second from Leonid Brezhnev, the First Secretary of the Communist Party of the Soviet Union, reacting very negatively to the event. Following this, the Central Committee of the Polish United Workers' Party begun pressuring the sports club to remove the monument, while people responsible for the news article about it were either fired or demoted to lower positions. The authors of the monument were persecuted by the Security Service, being interrogated numerous times, and having their houses searched. Being volunteers, and not receiving payment for their work on the sculpture, they were found to be suspicious by the authorities, who accused them of working for the foreign intelligence agencies.

The monument was removed in the late October 1969. A group of labourers and the Security Service officers took it apart at night, officially claiming it to be taken for the renovations. It was transported to an unknown location. According to some unofficial accounts, it was buried during the construction of the sewer networks in the neighbourhood of Krowodrza Górka in Kraków.

== Design ==
The American Astronauts Memorial was a modernist sculpture, made from a reinforced concrete painted in white. It was 8-metres-tall (26,25 ft.), with its form broken into three parts. Its base was a cuboid with height of 0.4 m (1.31 ft.), and sides of 2.5 m (8.2 ft.), with a half of a sphere placed on it. It was topped with a simplistic 6-metre-tall (19.68 ft.) human statue, with hands joined above its head looking upwards, forming an arrow, and reminiscing of a shape of a space rocket.
