= Central Photographic Agency (Poland) =

Polish photography agency (1951–1991)

- Centralna Agencja Fotograficzna
- Abbreviation: CAF
- Predecessor: API and ARiFP
- Successor: Polish Press Agency
- Formation: 1951
- Dissolved: 1991
- Purpose: Press photography
- Headquarters: Warsaw
- Parent organization: Prasa-Książka-Ruch

The Central Photographic Agency (Polish: Centralna Agencja Fotograficzna, CAF) was a Polish photography agency founded in Warsaw in 1951 to provide photographic services to state-controlled press of the Polish People's Republic. (Note: Between 1947 and 1952, while aligned with the USSR, the country's official name was the Republic of Poland.) In addition to supplying photographs, CAF was also responsible for assisting with the creation of maps and other illustrations reproduced in magazines and newspapers. By the time of its dissolution in 1991, following the end of communism in Poland, it had become the country's largest photography agency.

== History ==
Established in 1951 during Stalinist Poland, CAF was a result of the merger of the photographic departments of the Agencji Publicystyczno-Informacyjnej (API) and the Agencji Robotniczej i Filmu Polskiego (ARiFP). Although originally intended strictly as a government agency, CAF became part of the Prasa-Książka-Ruch, a press monopoly de facto controlled by the Polish United Workers' Party, within several months of its founding.

The agency was dissolved in 1991 following the end of the communist rule in Poland, and incorporated into the Polish Press Agency. According to historian Paweł Miedziński, CAF was founded to monopolize and control the dissemination of visual material to the general public and to minimize production costs by reducing the number of photographers hired directly by each newspaper. He notes that the latter goal was never fully achieved, despite the agency having regional offices founded in major Polish cities in the subsequent decades. The agency archives include over 12 million photographs which are preserved and maintained by the National Digital Archives of Poland.
