= Jacobites, 1745 =

Painting by John Pettie

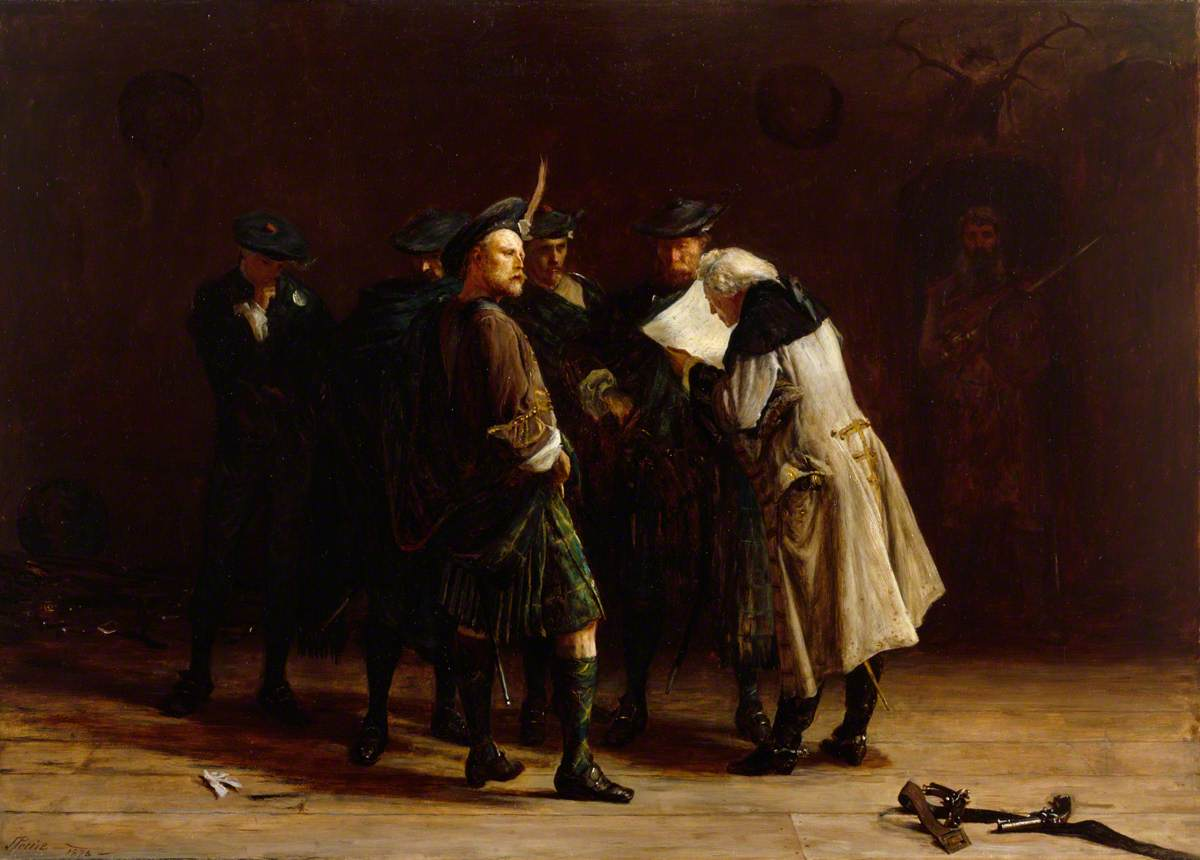
- Artist: John Pettie
- Year: 1874
- Type: Oil on canvas, history painting
- Dimensions: 90.8 cm × 127.3 cm (35.7 in × 50.1 in)
- Location: Royal Academy of Arts, London

Jacobites, 1745 is an 1874 oil painting by the British artist John Pettie. It depicts a scene from the Jacobite Rising of 1745 with a group of Highlanders rallying in support of the attempt to place James Francis Edward Stuart on the throne, led by his son and heir Charles Edward Stuart. The almost conspiratorial figures gathering together wear the white cockade to demonstrate their Jacobite allegiance. Pettie was known for his history paintings, often featuring scenes from Scottish history. The painting's dark background was criticised by the art critic John Ruskin, although he appreciated the "real pathos and most subtle expression" of the group of Highlanders.

In 1874 when he was elected to full membership of the Royal Academy of Arts in London Pettie was required to submit a diploma work and chose to present this. It was displayed at the Royal Academy Exhibition of 1875 held at Burlington House. It remains in the collection of the Royal Academy today.

== Bibliography ==
- Clarke, Deborah & Remington, Vanessa. Scottish Artists 1750-1900: From Caledonia to the Continent. Royal Collection Trust, 2015.
- Nicholson, Robin. Bonnie Prince Charlie and the Making of a Myth: A Study in Portraiture, 1720-1892. Bucknell University Press, 2002.
