= The Emperor Vitellius Dragged through the Streets of Rome by the People =

1882 painting by Georges Rochegrosse

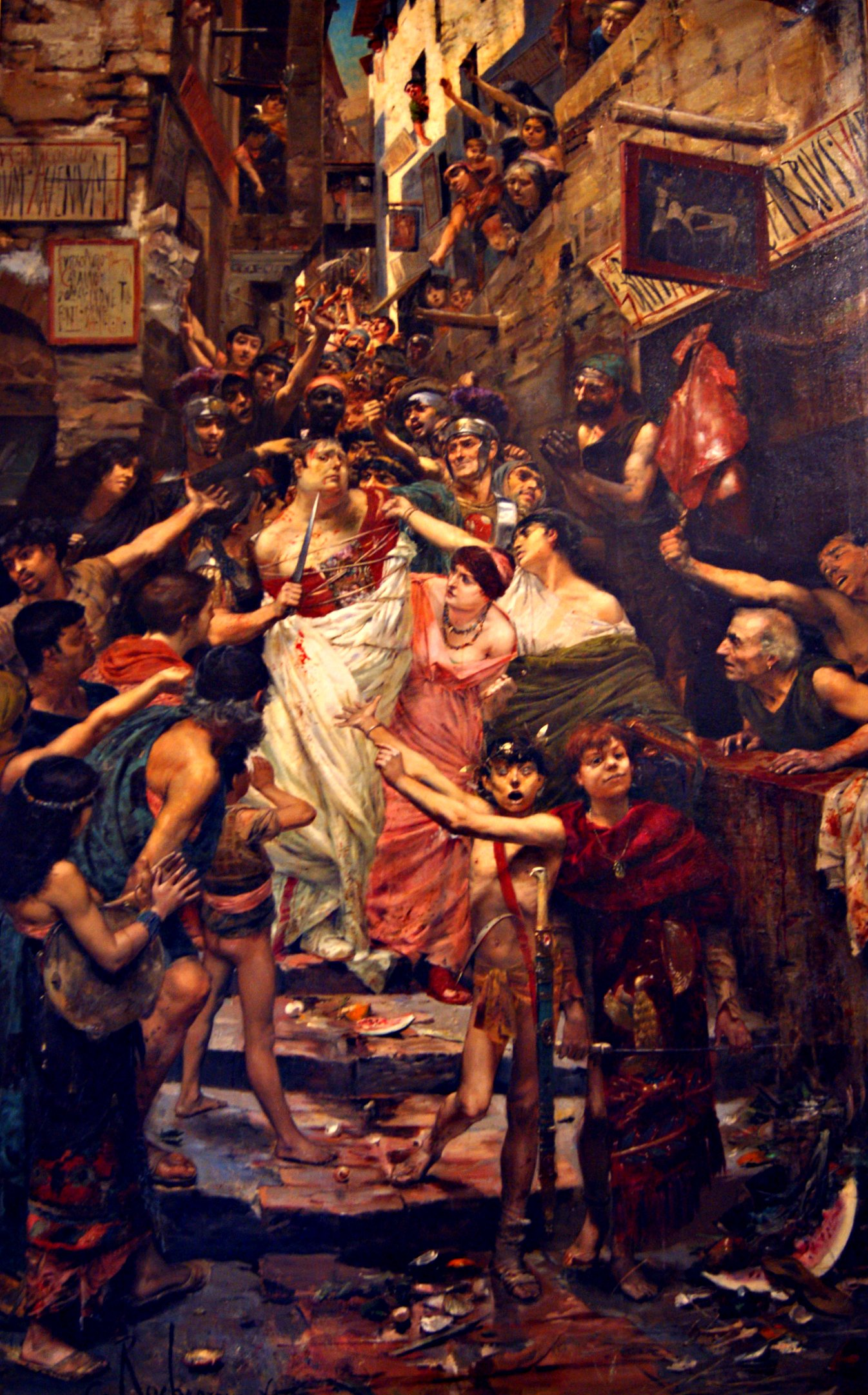
- Artist: Georges Rochegrosse
- Year: 1882
- Medium: Oil on canvas
- Dimensions: 160 cm × 247 cm (63 in × 97 in)

The Emperor Vitellius Dragged through the Streets of Rome by the People (1882) is a painting by Georges Rochegrosse (1859 – 1938). This work marked Rochegrosse's Paris Salon debut in 1882.

Vitellius was only Caesar for eight months during the Year of the Four Emperors. Rochegrosse here depicts Vitellius being moved down the Gemonian Stairs against his will, with a lengthy dagger positioned at his gullet.
