= Georges Rochegrosse =

French painter (1859–1938)

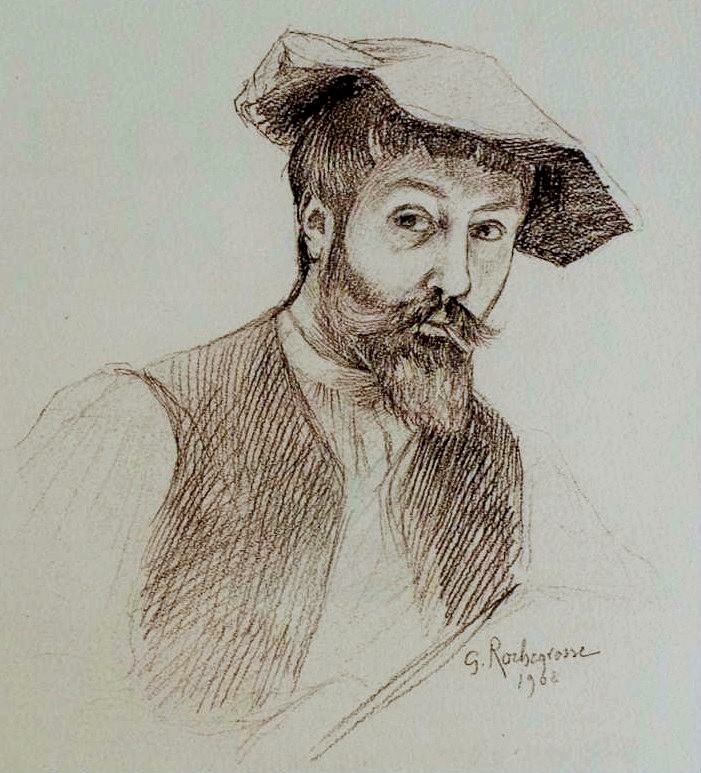
- Georges Rochegrosse. Self-portrait, 1908
- Born: Georges-Antoine-Marie Rochegrosse; 2 August 1859; Versailles, France
- Died: 11 July 1938 (aged 78); El Biar, French Algeria
- Resting place: Montparnasse Cemetery
- Education: Jules Joseph Lefebvre and Gustave Boulanger in Paris
- Known for: Painter, illustrator, poster artist, and etcher
- Movement: Orientalist
- Spouse: Marie Leblond
- Awards: Officer of the Legion of Honor (1892)

Georges Antoine Rochegrosse (French: [ʒɔʁʒ ɑ̃twan ʁɔʃɡʁɔs]; 2 August 1859 – 11 July 1938) was a French historical and decorative painter.

== Life and career ==
Georges Rochegrosse was born in Versailles and studied in Paris with Jules Joseph Lefebvre and Gustave Clarence Rodolphe Boulanger. His themes are generally historical, and he treated them on a colossal scale and in an emotional naturalistic style, with a distinct revelling in horrible subjects and details.

He made his Paris Salon début in 1882 with Vitellius traîné dans les rues de Rome par la populace (The Emperor Vitellius Dragged through the Streets of Rome by the People) (1882; Sens). He followed this the year afterwards with Andromaque (1882–83; Musée des Beaux-Arts de Rouen), which won that year's prestigious Prix du Salon. There followed La Jacquerie (1885; Untraced), La mort de Babylone (The fall of Babylon) (1891; Untraced), The death of the Emperor Geta (1899; Musée de Picardie, Amiens), and Barbarian ambassadors at the Court of Justinian (1907; Untraced), all of which exemplify his strong and spirited but sensational and often brutal painting. In quite another style and beautiful in colour is his Le Chevalier aux Fleurs (The Knight of Flowers) (1894; Musée d’Orsay, Paris; RF 898).

He was elected an Officer of the Legion of Honour in 1892 and received the Medal of Honour in 1906 for The Red Delight. Rochegrosse also illustrated several books. His great love, his wife Marie Rochegrosse (née Leblond), had died in 1920. He lived his final years in El Biar, in French Algeria, where he died. He is buried in Paris, in the Montparnasse Cemetery, near the poet Theodore de Banville, his stepfather.

== Selected works ==
Paintings

Algerian dancer or Salammbô 1886

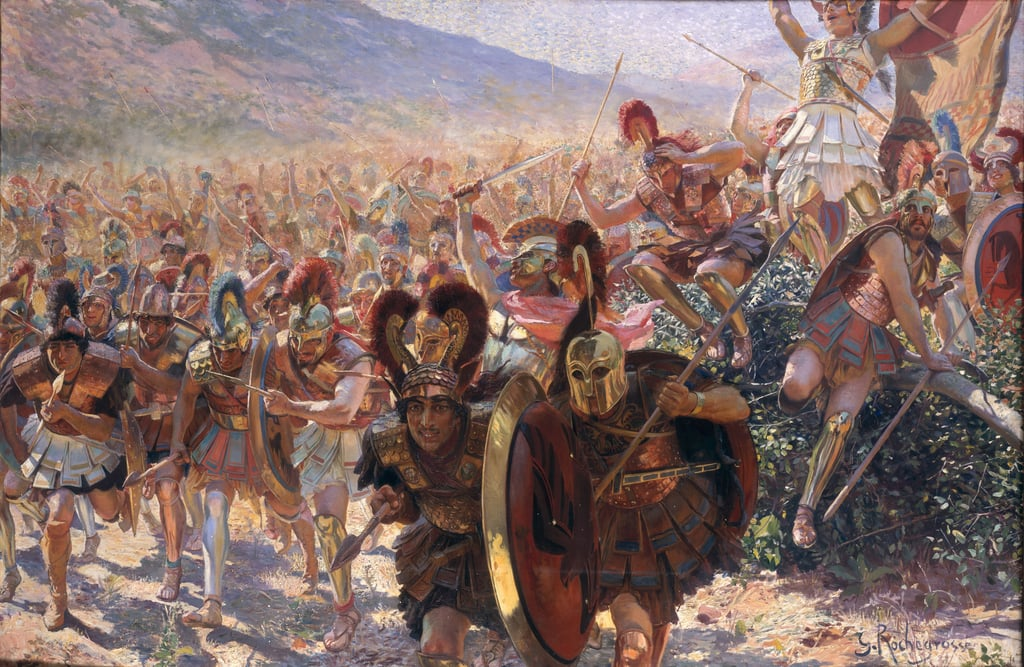
Greek troops rushing forward at the Battle of Marathon

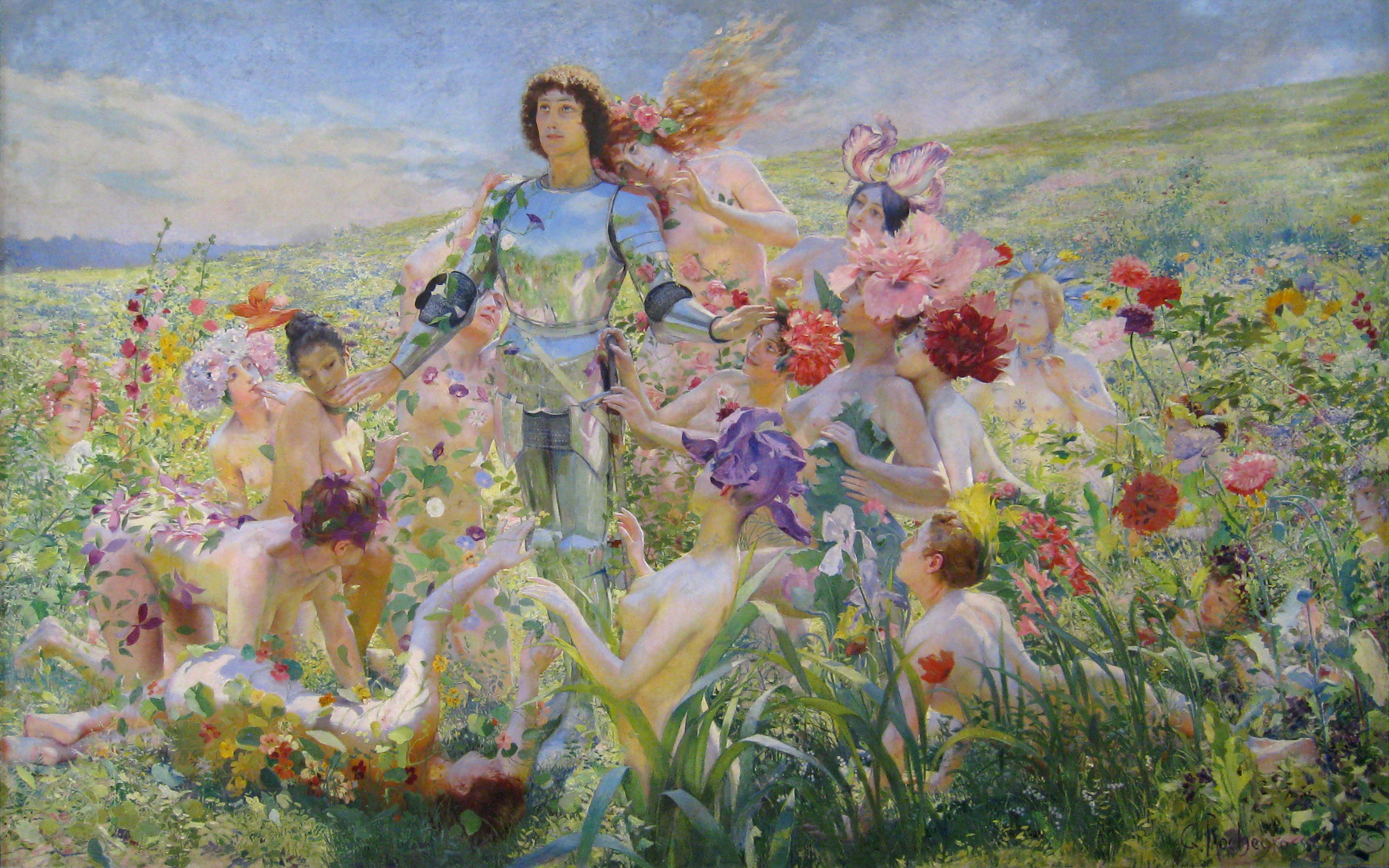
The Knight of the Flowers

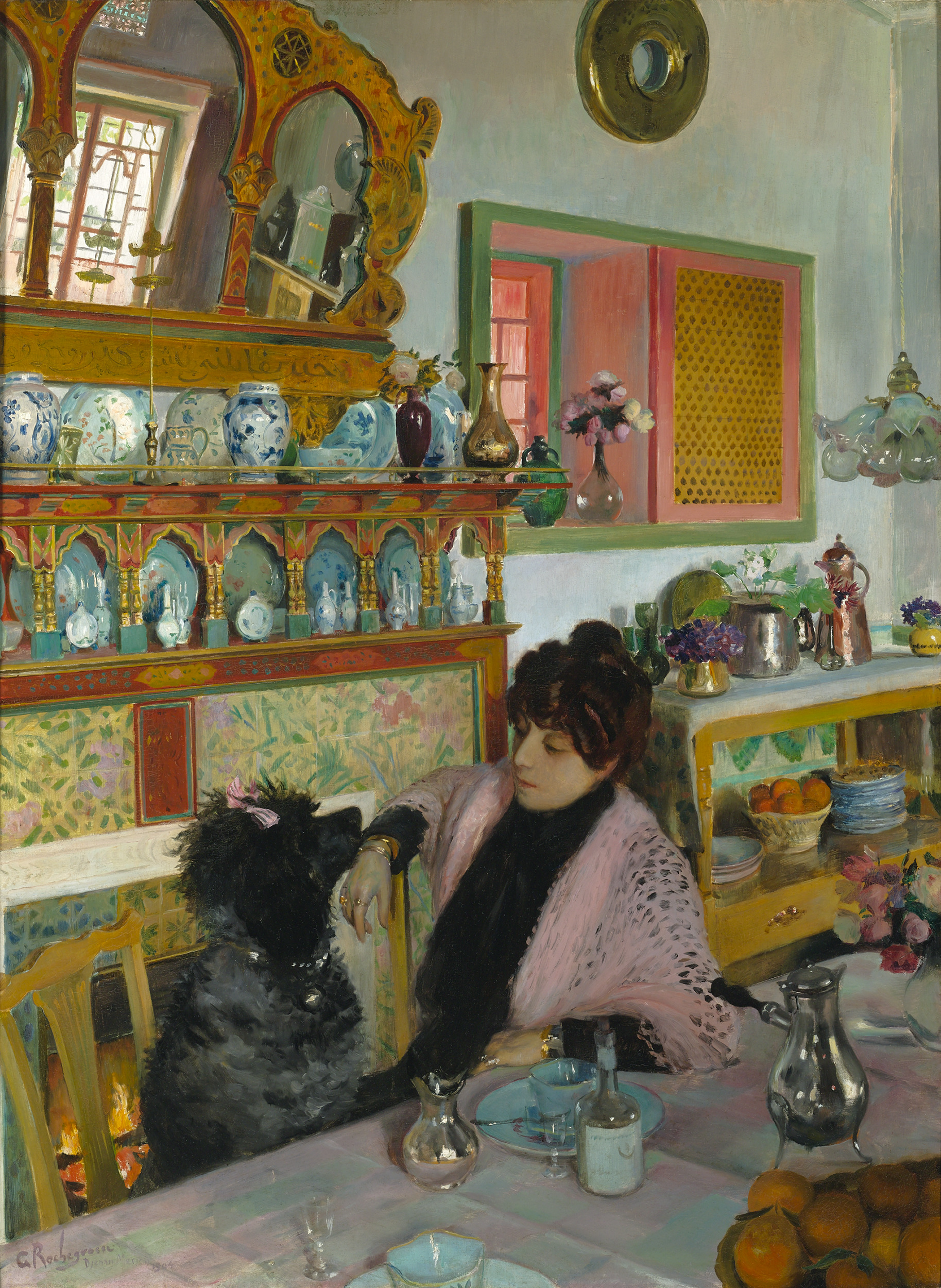
Marie Rochegrosse in the Dining Room

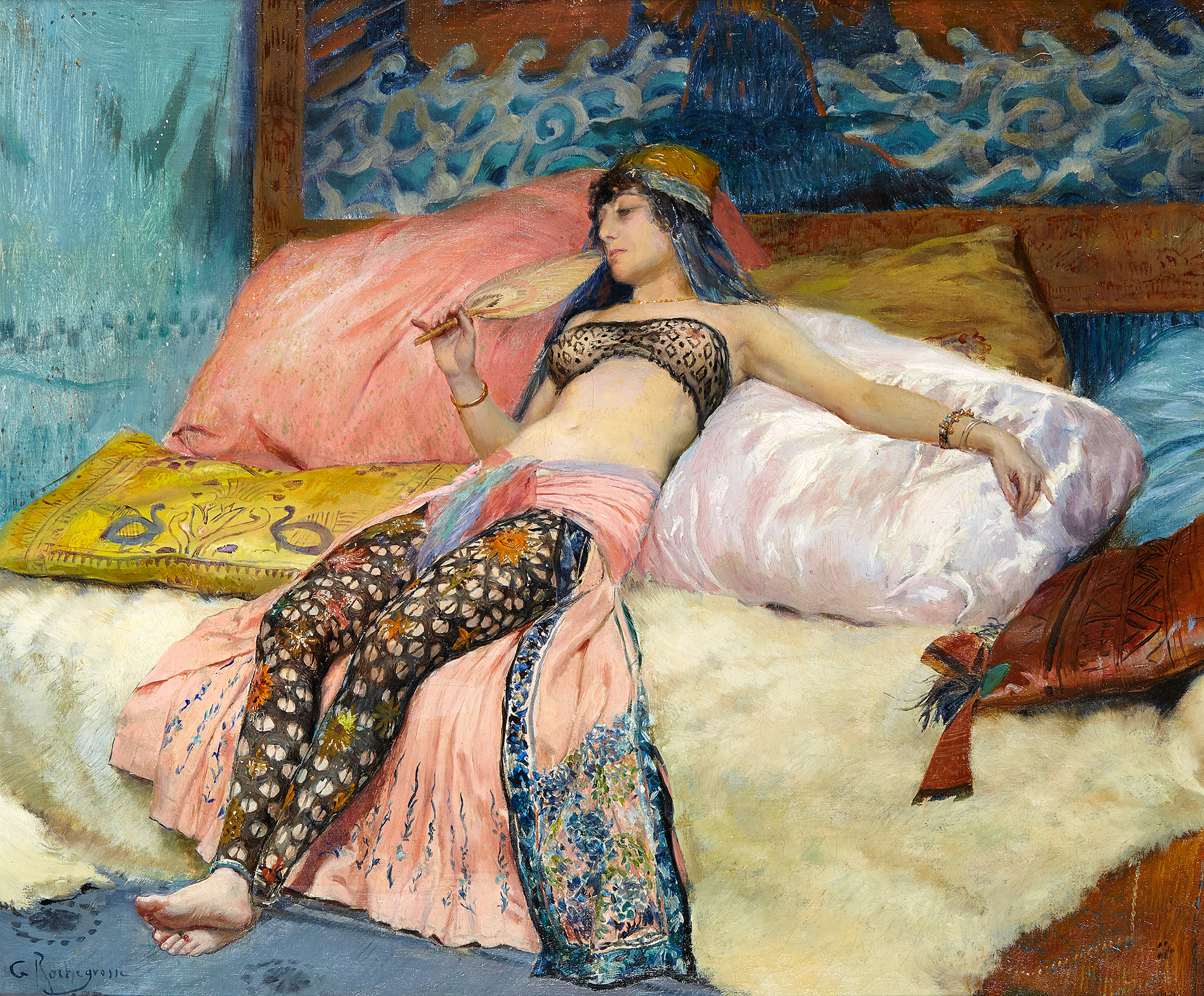
Portrait of Sarah Bernhardt
in Costume

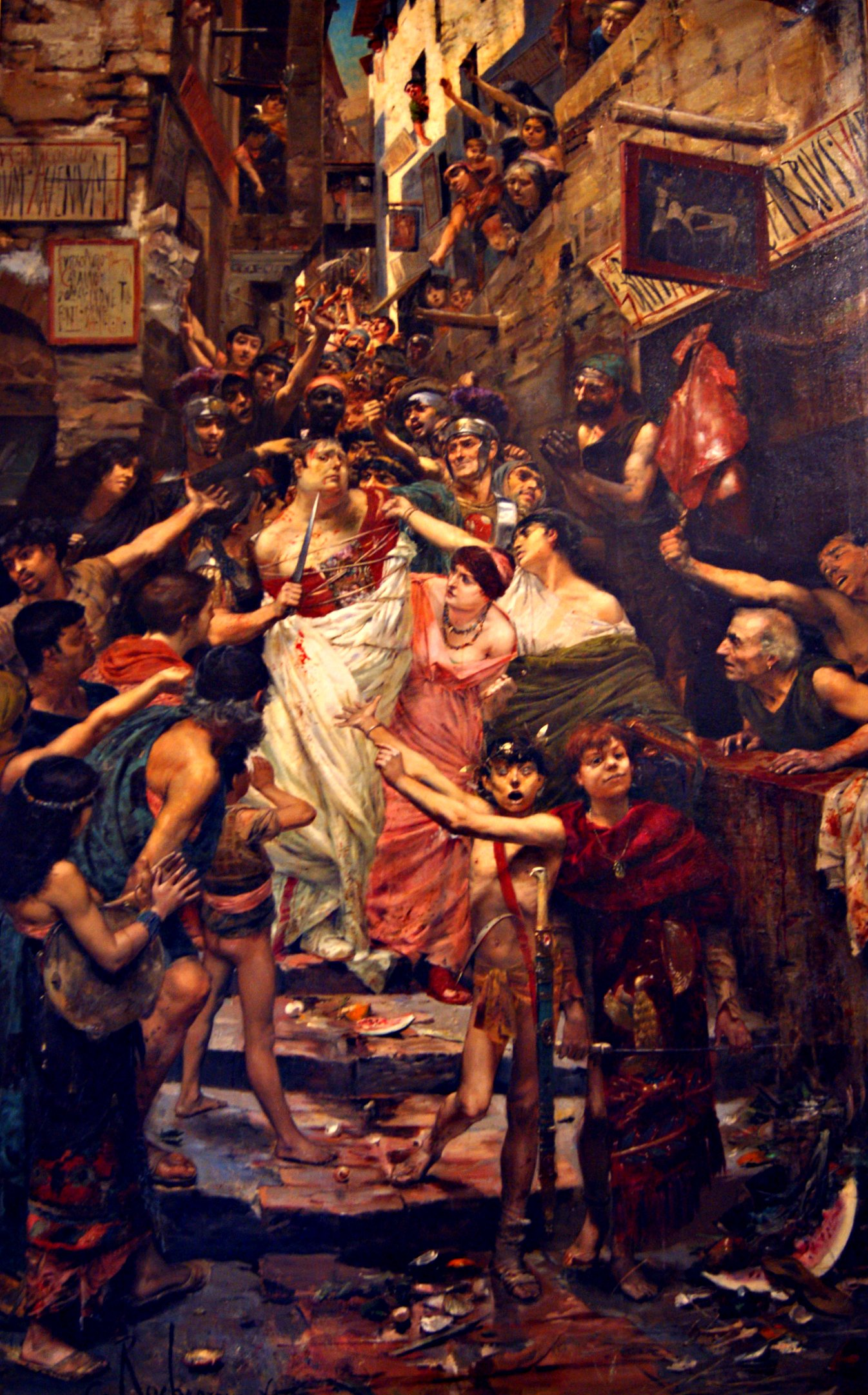
Vitellius
Dragged Through the Streets of Rome by the Populace

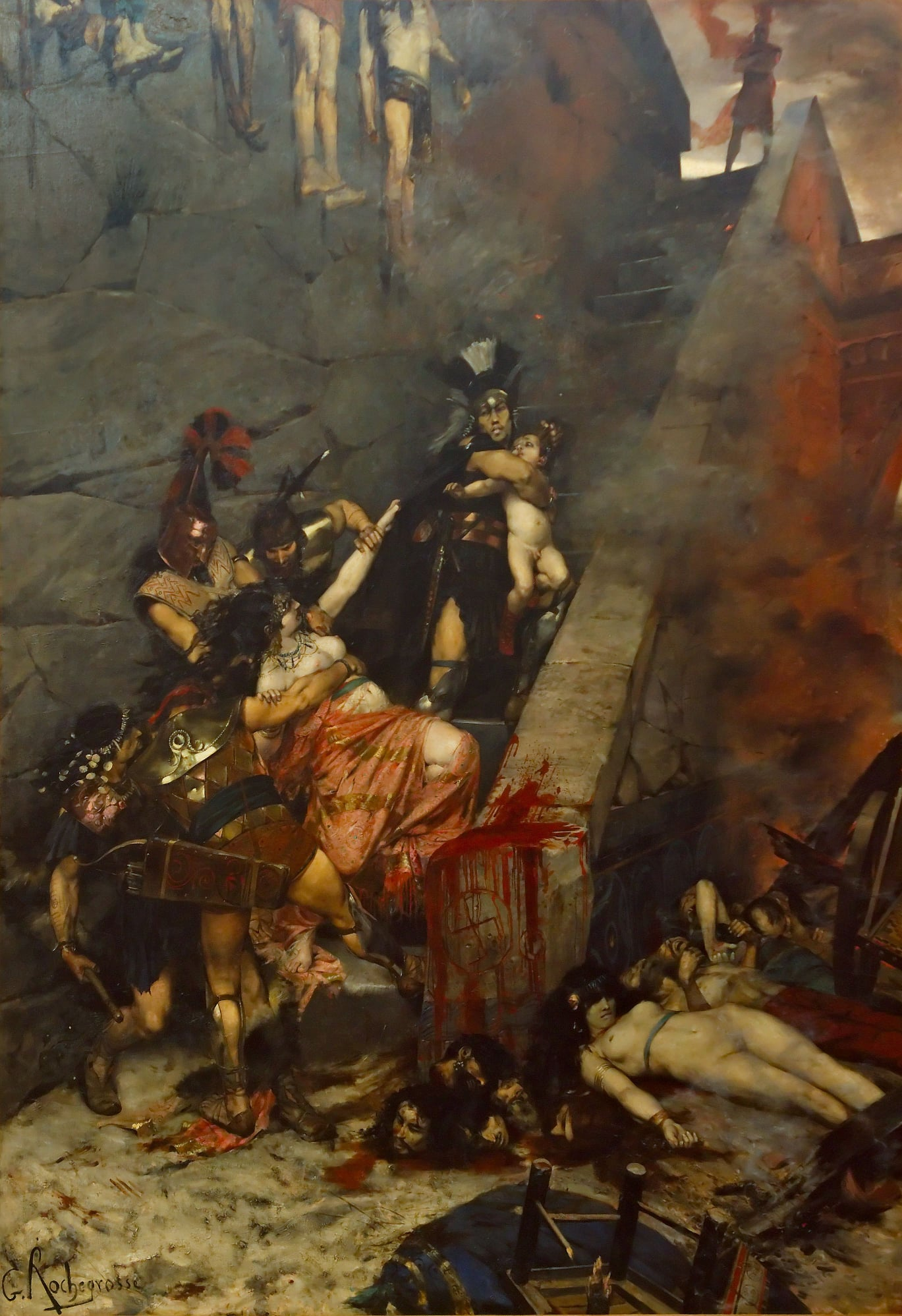
Astyanax torn from the arms of his mother Andromache to be killed by the Greek leaders during the Trojan War

Posters

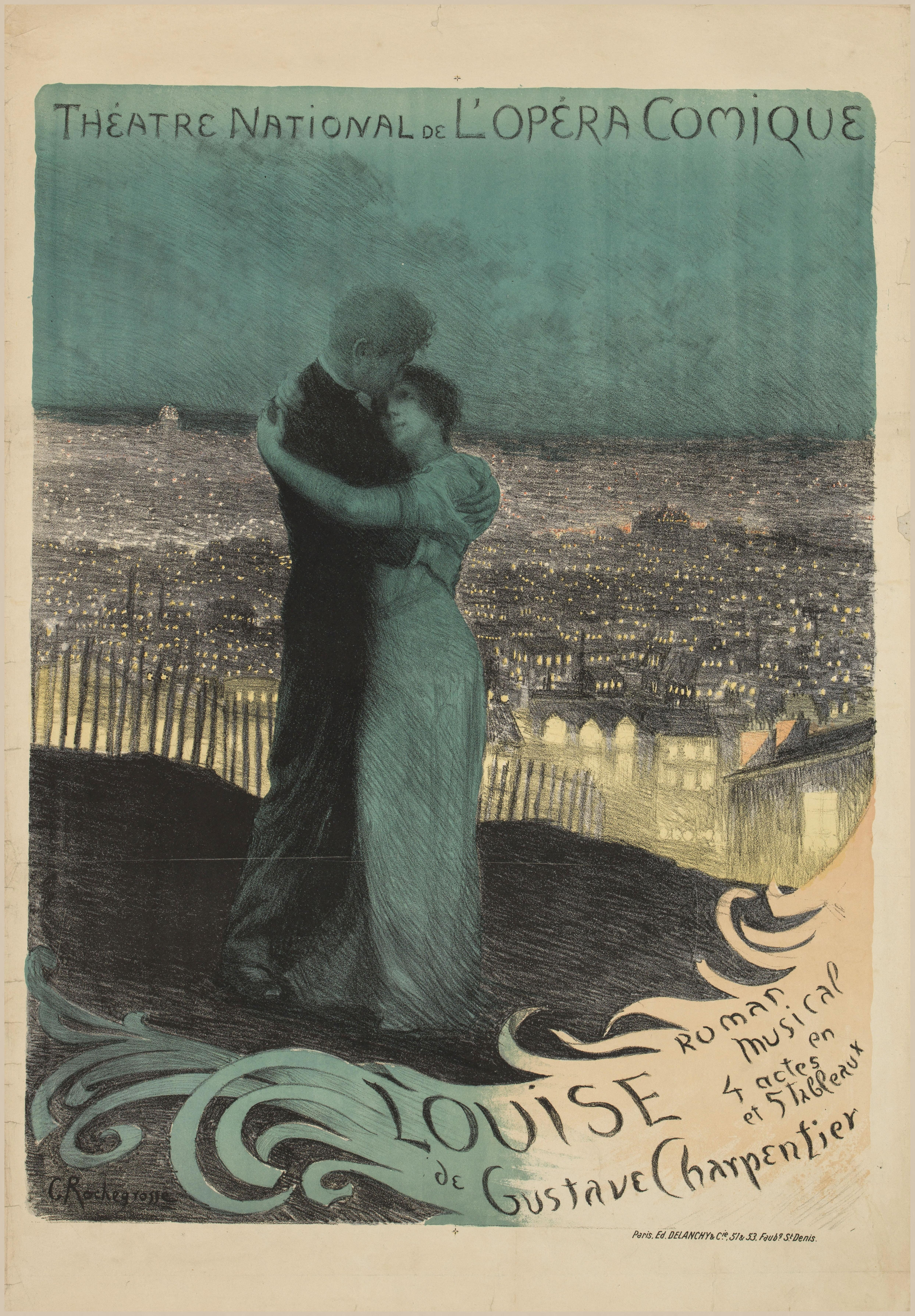
Poster for Gustave Charpentier's Louise (1900)

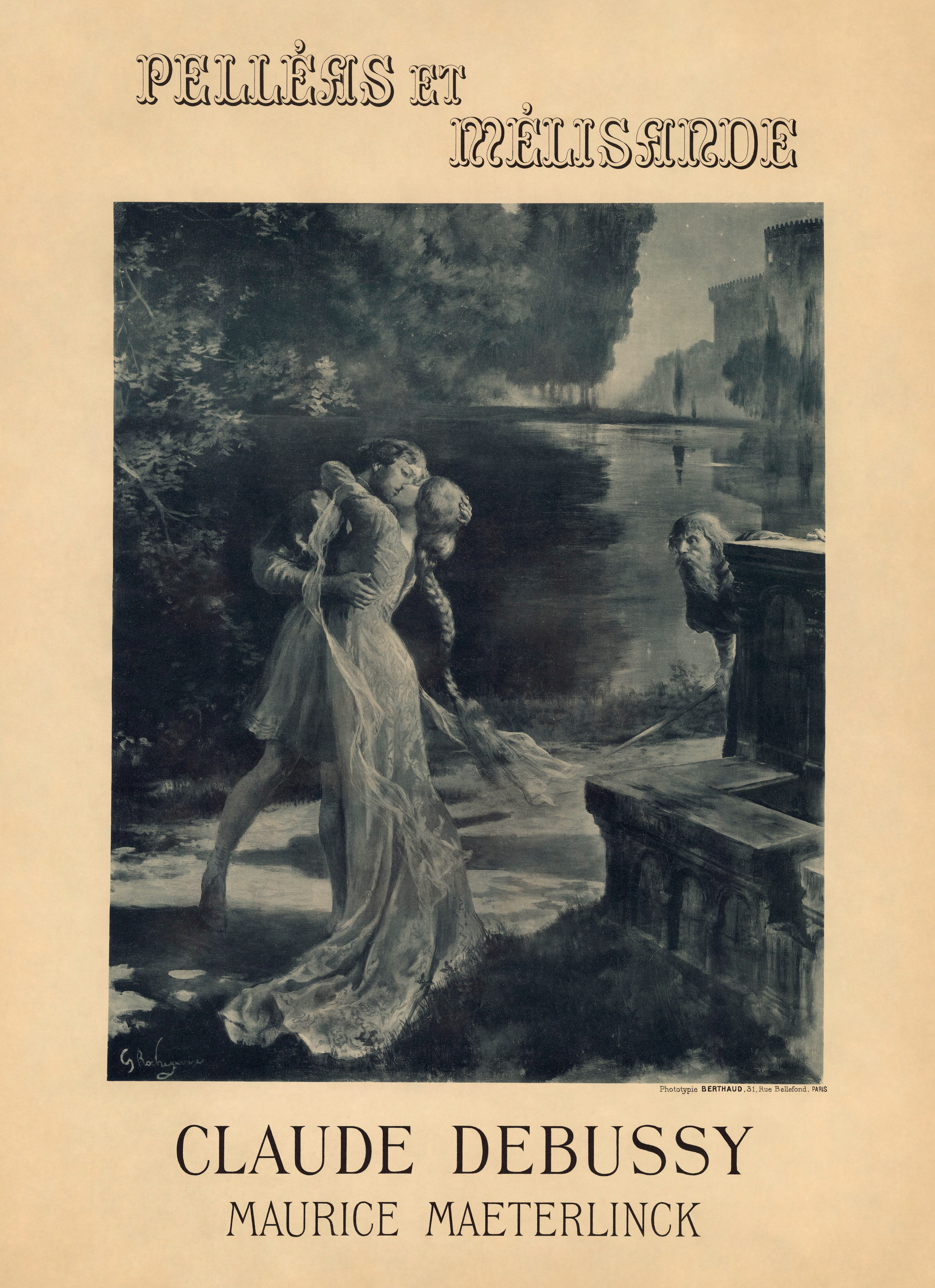
Phototype reproduction of Rochegrosse's art used in the poster for the première of Claude Debussy and Maurice Maeterlinck's Pelléas et Mélisande (1902)

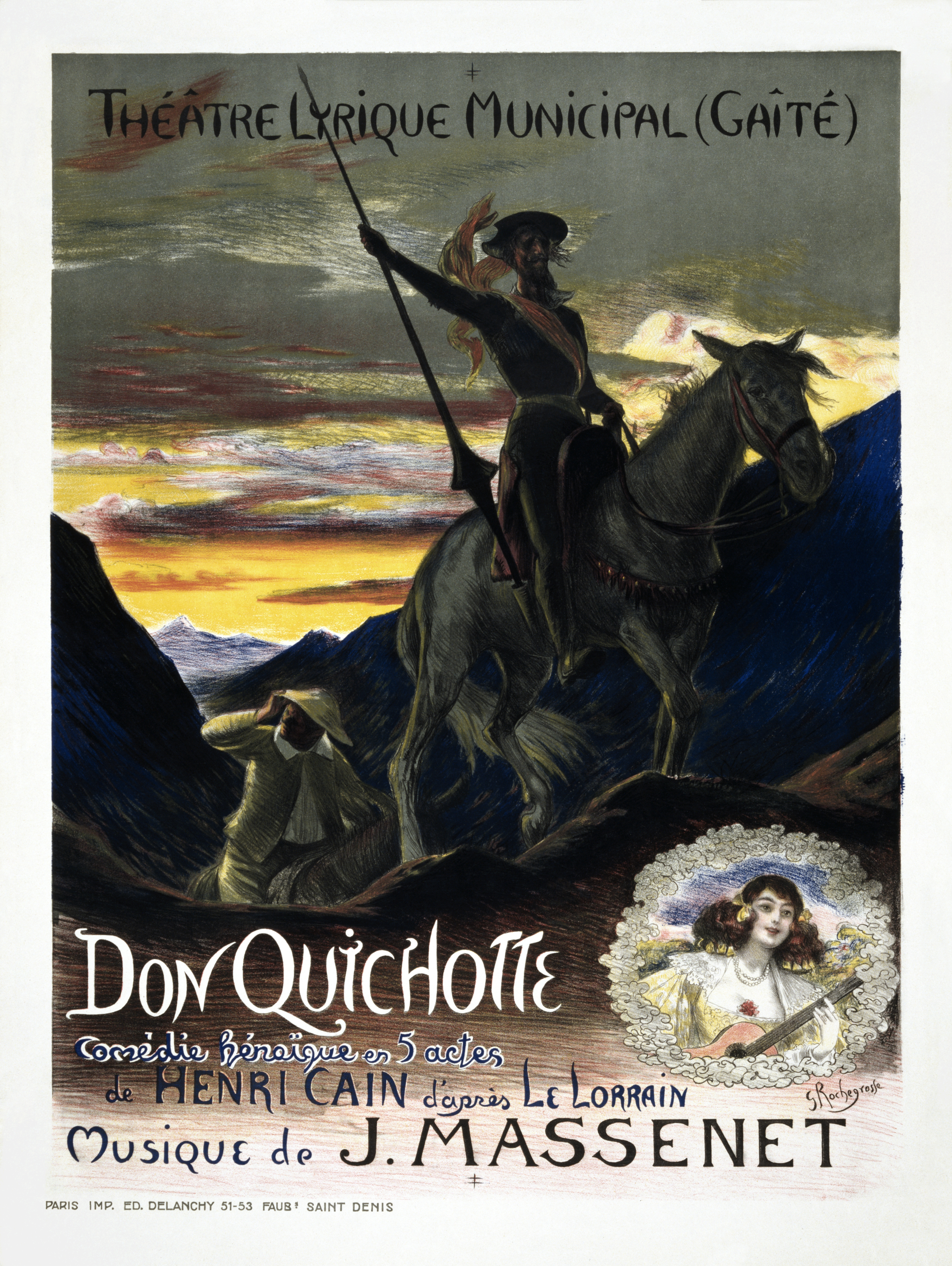
Poster for
Don Quichotte (1910)
by Jules Massenet

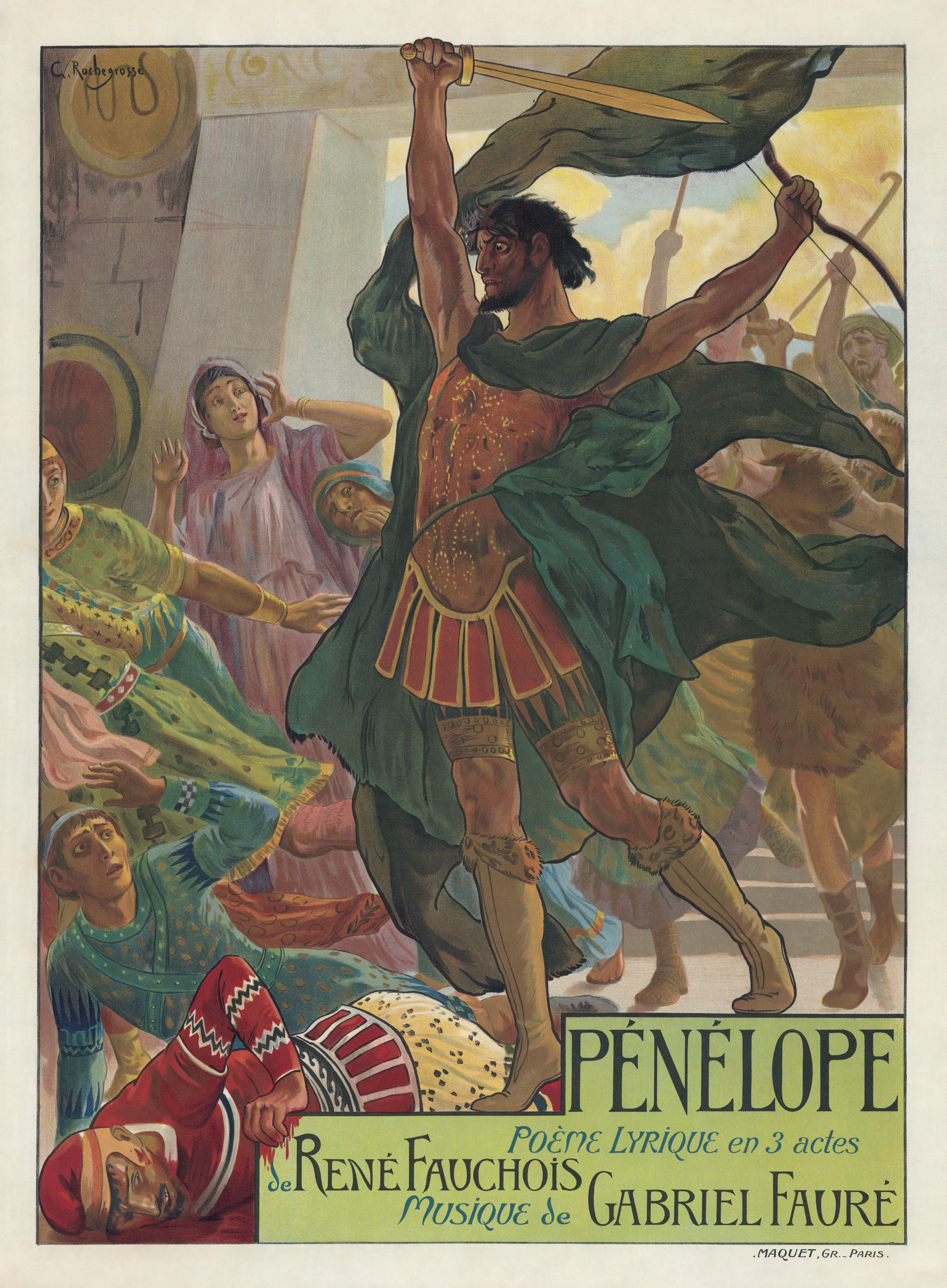
Poster for the Paris première of Pénélope (1913)

== Sources ==
- Gilman, D. C.; Peck, H. T.; Colby, F. M., eds. (1905). "Rochegrosse". New International Encyclopedia (1st ed.). New York: Dodd, Mead.
