= Abigail McLellan =

Scottish artist (1969–2009)

- Born: 11 July 1969; Middlesbrough, England
- Died: 11 October 2009 (aged 40)
- Education: Glasgow School of Art, Cincinnati University
- Known for: painting
- Partner: Alasdair Wallace

Abigail McLellan (11 July 1969 – 11 October 2009) was a Scottish artist. She primarily showed her work at the Rebecca Hossack Gallery and the Glasgow Print Studio.

== Biography ==
McLellan was born in Middlesbrough, where her father was an engineer with ICI, but her family moved to Dumfries when she was 12 years old. McLellan had two older sisters.

McLellan trained at the Glasgow School of Art. In 1987, she also attended Cincinnati University on a scholarship. Later, she attended the Cite Internationale de arts studios in Paris, France. She exhibited at the National Portrait Exhibition at the Royal Scottish Academy.

In 1998, McLellan began to show signs of health issues while in Japan. She was later diagnosed with multiple sclerosis. Despite the diagnosis, McLellan insisted on living her life in a similar manner to before she became ill: she walked up four flights of stairs to her studio for as long as she was able. When she could no longer stand, she worked in her studio from a wheelchair.

She was known for still-life paintings consisting of "pared-down, almost abstracted, images of single plants, flowers, and other distinct items, set against richly-worked backgrounds of saturated colour" and portraits, both bearing the strong influence of Japanese art. Scottish art traditions were also an important influence on her work. The process of creating her art involved a "detailed process" of building up multiple layers of acrylic paint on canvas.

McLellan was considered a hard worker, and had been in her studio working the day that she had to be taken into hospital for the last time. She died there a week later.

McLellan met her partner, painter Alasdair Wallace, at the Glasgow School of Art. After being together for eighteen years, they married in 2009. She died aged 40 the same year from complications of multiple sclerosis.
