= Kanda Nissho =

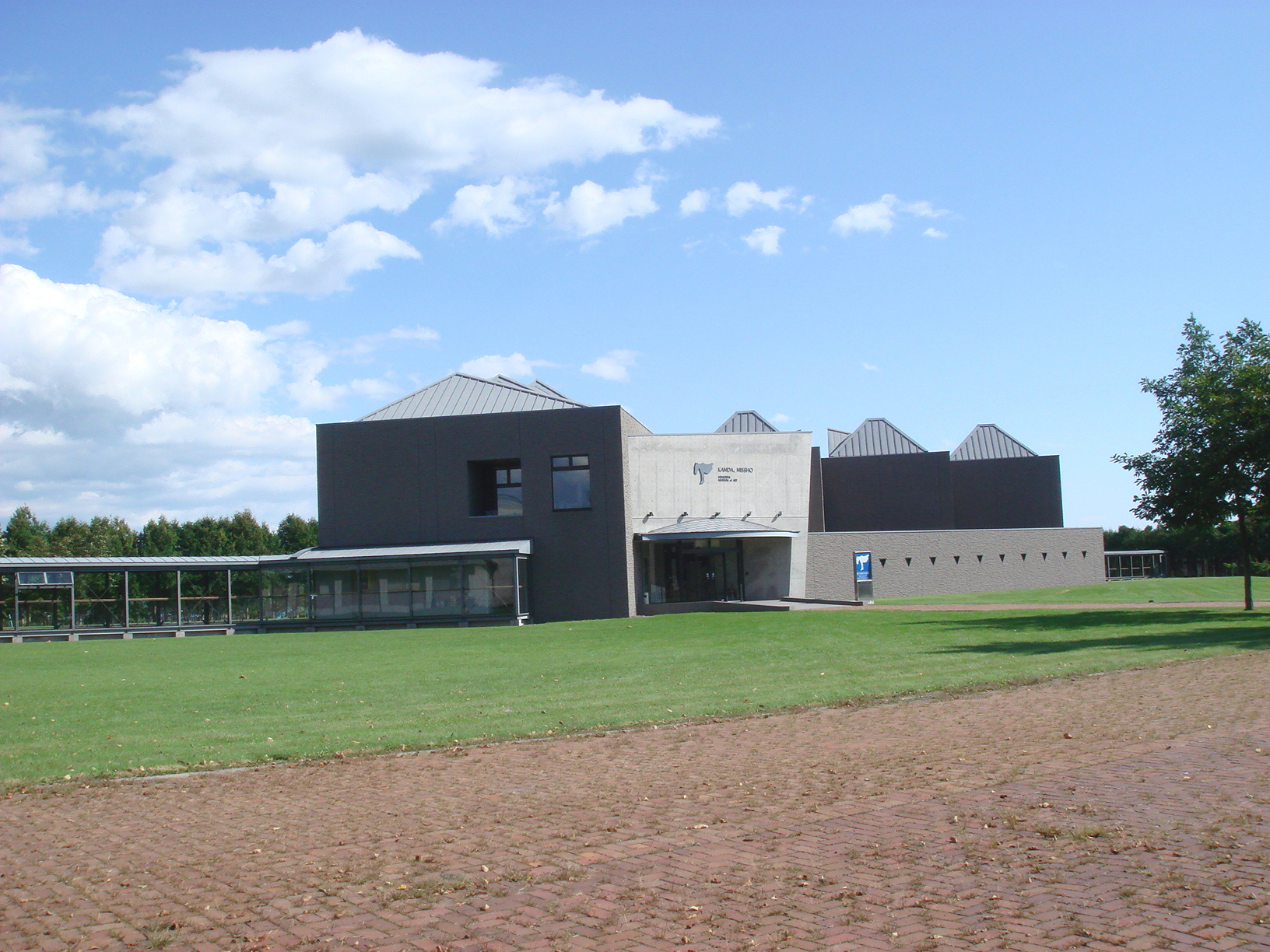
Kanda Nissho Memorial Museum in Shikaoi, Hokkaido

Kanda Nissho (神田 日勝; 1937–1970) was a Japanese artist and farmer. He is known mostly for his oil paintings.

Nissho Kanda was born in 1937 in the Nerima district of Tokyo. When he was seven, his family moved to the Tokachi district in Hokkaidō to work the farmland there. Raised in the hard, unfamiliar life of a settler’s family, he eventually became a farmer himself. At the same time, he came to put his heart into painting. His powerful works depicting scenes of daily life, each brushstroke imbued with his soul, gradually gained acclaim in the art world. However, in 1970, just when he was beginning to develop new modes of expression, he died of illness at the age of 32. His last painting of a horse was incomplete, with its body half finished.

In 1993, Kanda Nissho Memorial Museum of Art was established in Tokachi, Hokkaidō. Kanda’s unfinished last work, Horse serves as the symbol of the museum. Since his death, other works such as Interiors have been in the collection of the Hokkaidō Museum of Modern Art in Sapporo and the Hokkaidō Obihiro Museum of Art in Obihiro.

== A list of representative works ==
- Gomi-bako (ゴミ箱, "Garbage", 1961)
- Ie (家, "House", 1962)
- Hanba no fūkei (飯場の風景, "Laborars Lodging", 1963)
- Ushi (牛, "Cow", 1964)
- Uma (馬, "Horse", 1965)
- Seibutsu (静物, "Still Life", 1966)
- Gashitsu A (画室A, "Studio A", 1966)
- Gashitsu B (画室B, "Studio B", 1966)
- Hareta hi no fukei (晴れた日の風景, "A Sunny-day Scene", 1968)
- Yuki no nōjō (雪の農場, "Snow Farm", 1969)
- Shitsunai fūkei (室内風景, "Interiors", 1970)
- Uma (Zeppitsu, Mikan) (馬（絶筆・未完）, "Horse (last work, unfinished)", 1970)
