= John Pettie =

Scottish painter (1839–1893)

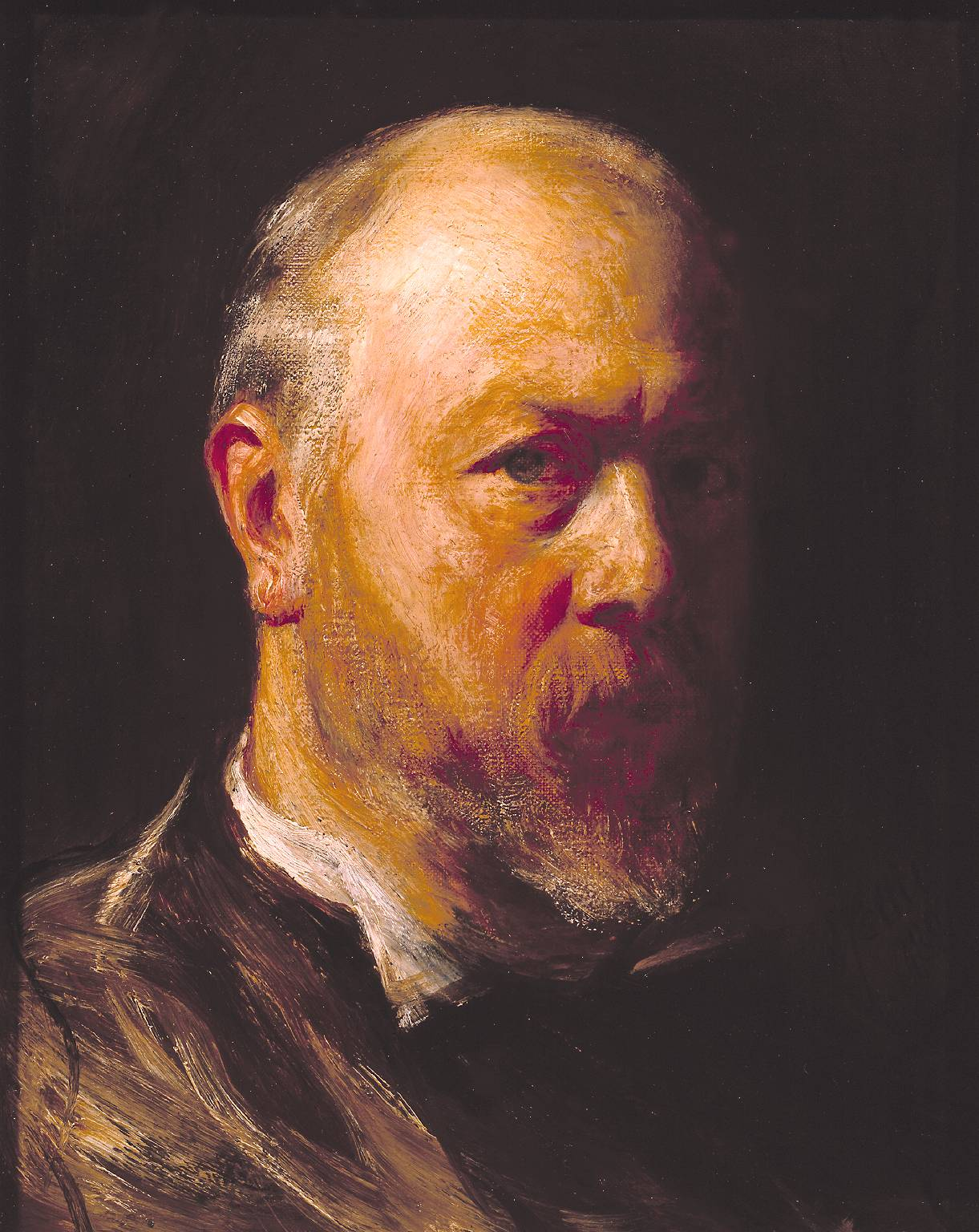
- Self-portrait, 1882
- Born: 17 March 1839; Edinburgh, Scotland
- Died: 21 February 1893 (aged 53); Hastings, Sussex

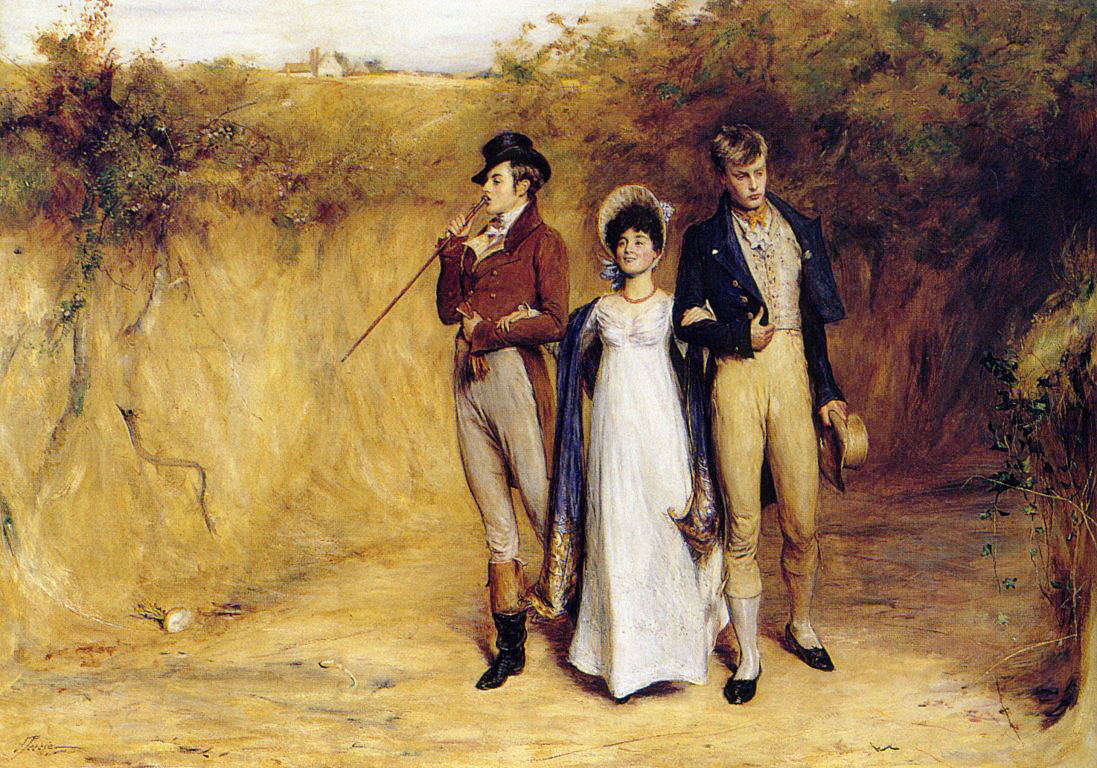
Two Strings to her Bow, by John Pettie, 1887

John Pettie RA (17 March 1839 – 21 February 1893) was a Scottish painter from Edinburgh who spent most of his career in London. He became an associate member of the Royal Academy in 1866 and a full academician in 1874.

As an enthusiastic amateur musician, he helped the career of the young composer Hamish MacCunn by organising concerts for him in his own studio. MacCunn, who would marry Pettie's daughter Alison in 1889, also served as a model for many of his paintings and sketches in various distinctive occasions.

== Biography ==
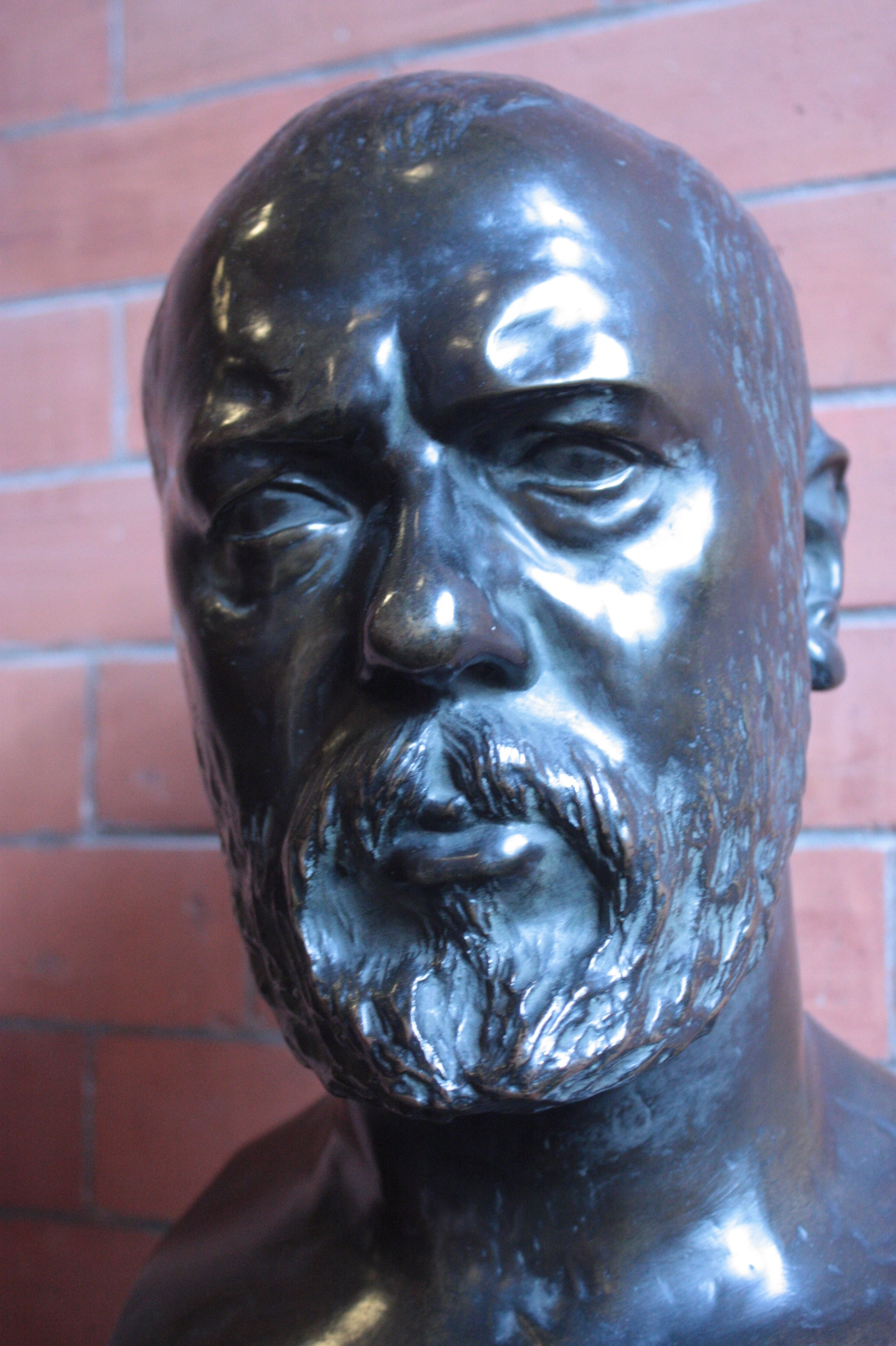
John Pettie by George Anderson Lawson

John Pettie was born in Edinburgh, the son of Alexander and Alison Pettie. In 1852 the family moved to East Linton, Haddingtonshire. Initially, his father objected to him taking up art as a career, but this was overcome following a portrait by Pettie of the village carrier and his donkey.

When he was sixteen he entered the Trustees Academy in Edinburgh, working under Robert Scott Lauder with William Quiller Orchardson, J. MacWhirter, William McTaggart, Peter Graham (1836–1921), Tom Graham (1840–1906) and George Paul Chalmers. His first exhibits at the Royal Scottish Academy were A Scene from the Fortunes of Nigel, one of the many subjects for which he sought inspiration in the novels of Sir Walter Scott, and two portraits in 1858, followed in 1859 by The Prison. To the Royal Academy in 1860 he sent The Armourers; and the success of this work and What d'ye Lack, Madam? in the following year encouraged him to settle in London (1862), where he joined Orchardson.

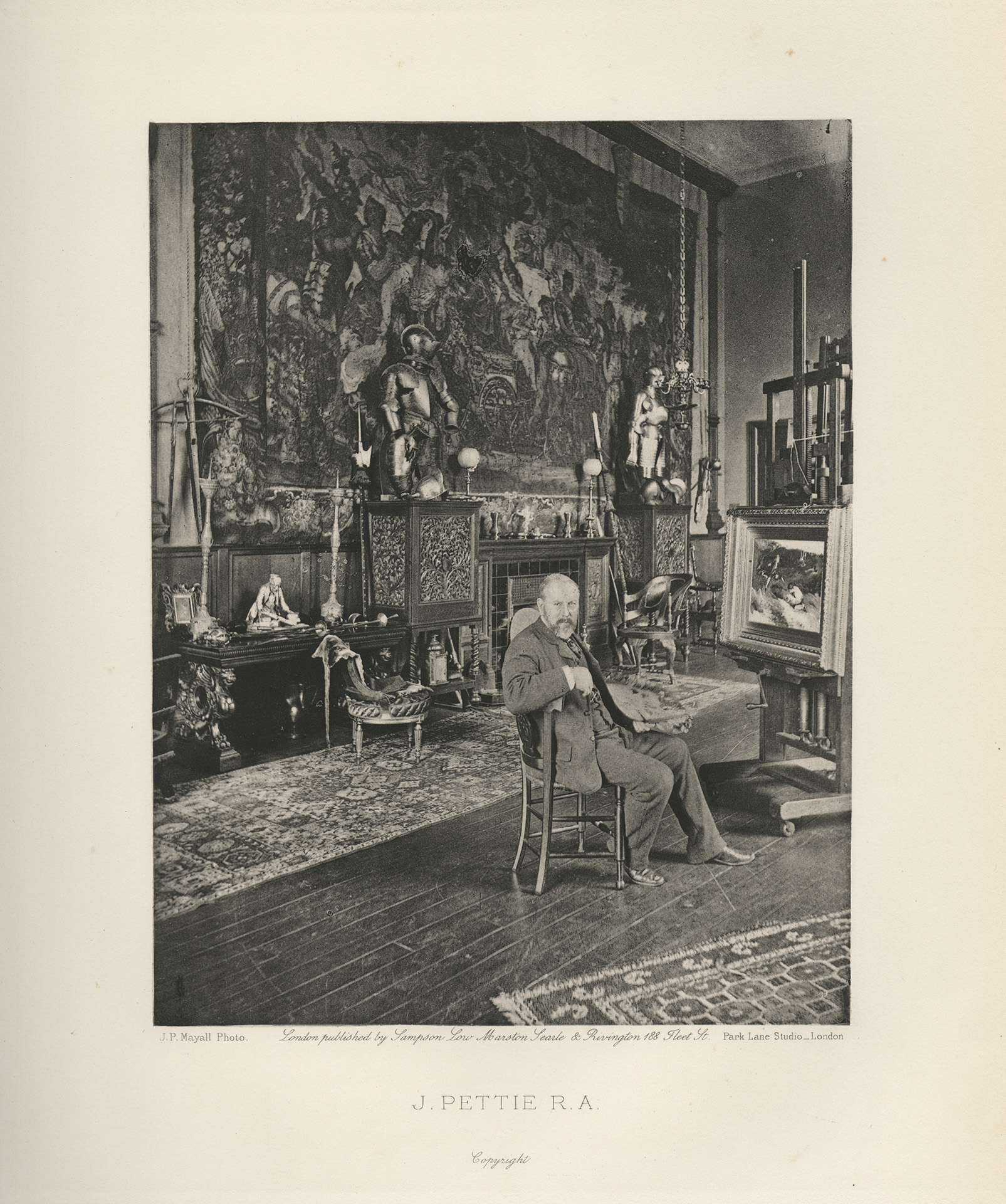
Pettie by J. P. Mayall from Artists at Home, published 1884, Department of Image Collections, National Gallery of Art Library, Washington, DC

In 1866 he was elected an Associate of the Royal Academy, and in 1874 received full academical honours in succession to Sir Edwin Landseer. His diploma picture was Jacobites, 1745. Pettie was a hard and rapid worker, and, in his best days, a colourist of a high order and a brilliant executant. In his early days he produced a certain amount of book illustration. His connection with Good Words began in 1861, and was continued until 1864. He painted a portrait of the painter James Campbell Noble RSA and this is exhibited in the Scottish National Portrait Gallery in Edinburgh. His Two Strings to her Bow, in which the composer Hamish MacCunn is portrayed, is now in the Kelvingrove Art Gallery, Glasgow. In 1917 it was in demand as a cigarette card from soldiers fighting in the war. In 1894 a selection of his work was included in the Winter Exhibition of the Royal Academy. His self-portrait is in the Tate Gallery.

The National Portrait Gallery has four of his works in its collection.

== Works ==
With William McTaggart and others, he illustrated The Postman's Bag (Strahan, 1862), and with John MacWhirter he illustrated Wordsworth's Poetry for the Young (Strahan, 1863). His principal paintings, in addition to those already mentioned, are:

- Cromwell's Saints (1862)
- The Trio (1863)
- George Fox refusing to take the Oath (1864)
- A Drumhead Courtmartial (1865)
- The Arrest for Witchcraft (1866)
- Treason (1867)
- Tussle with a Highland Smuggler (1868)
- The Sally (1870)
- Terms to the Besieged (1872)
- The Flag of Truce (1873)
- Ho! Ho! Old Null and A State Secret (1874)
- A Sword and Dagger Fight (1877)
- The Hour (1878)
- The Death Warrant (1879)
- Monmouth and James II (1882)
- The Vigil (1884)
- Challenged (1883)
- The Chieftain's Candlesticks (1886)
- Two Strings to Her Bow (1887)
- The Traitor and Sir Charles Wyndham as David Garrick (1888)
- The Ultimatum and Bonnie Prince Charlie (1892)

== Literature ==
- The book John Pettie, R.A., H.R.S.A. (London, 1908), by his nephew Martin Hardie, gives the story of his life, a catalogue of his pictures, and fifty reproductions in colour.

== Gallery ==
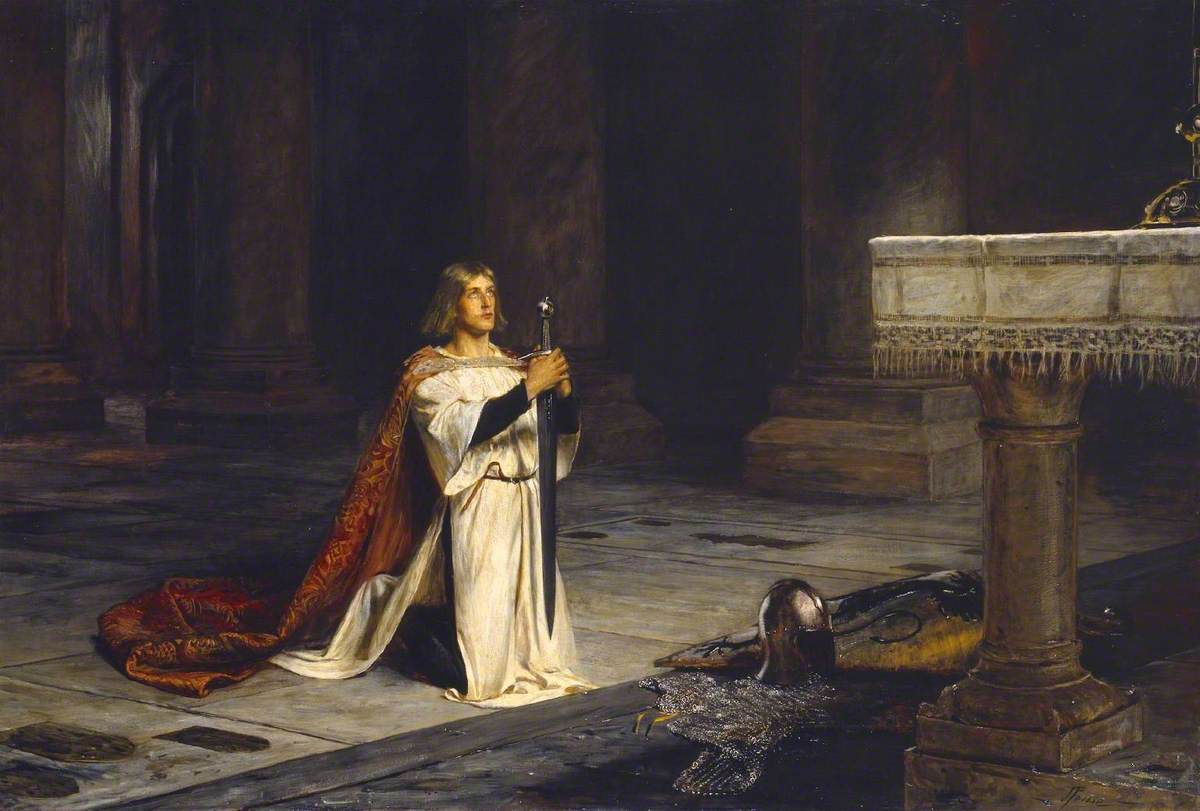
The design of the Church Army Chapel, Blackheath, was influenced by The Vigil, the spire and east window carrying the same shape and symbolism as the sword in this painting, on exhibition in the Tate Gallery.

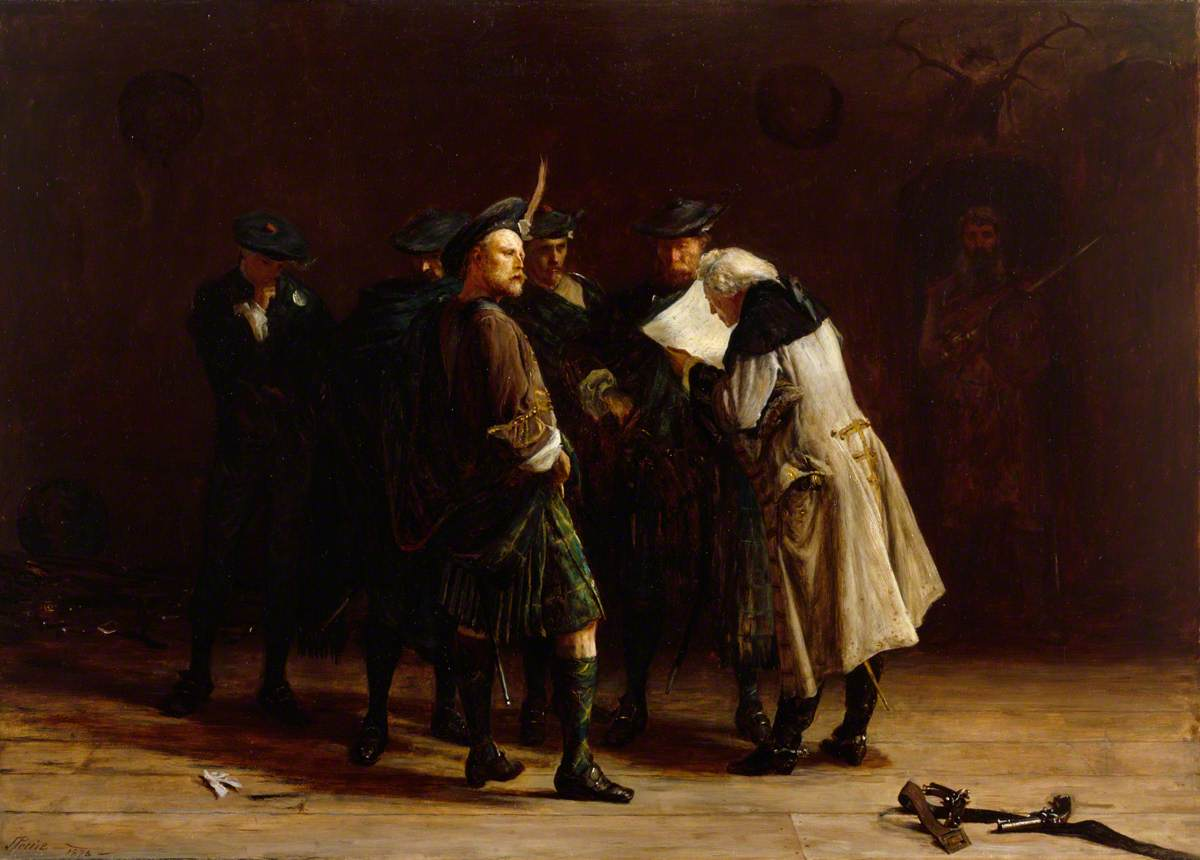
Jacobites, 1745 (1874).

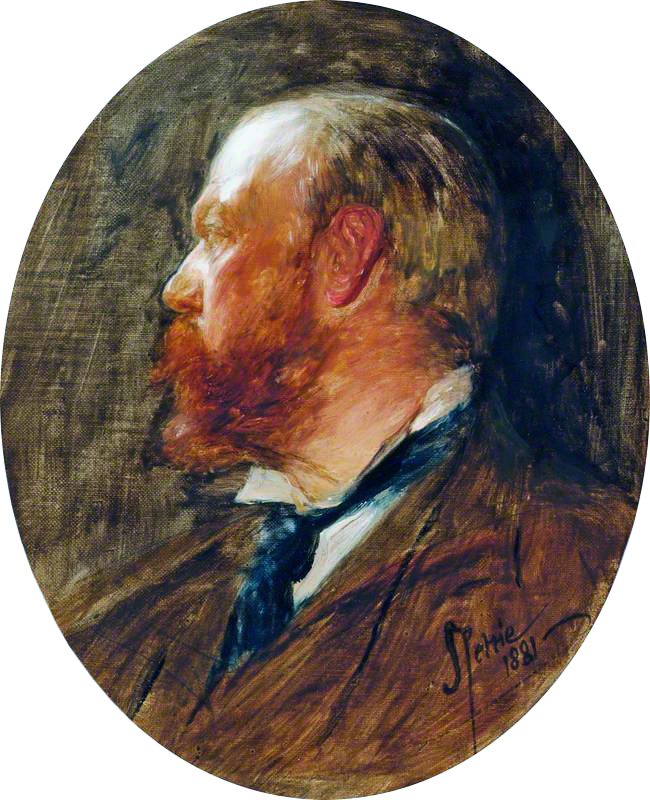
Self-portrait (1881).

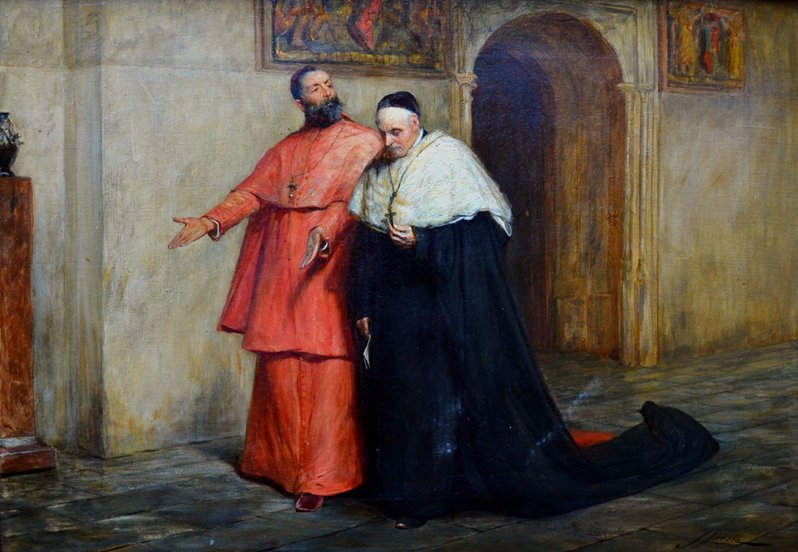
Reductio Ad Absurdum

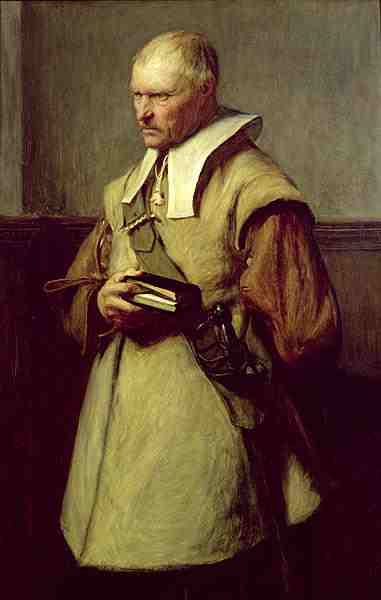
The Puritan

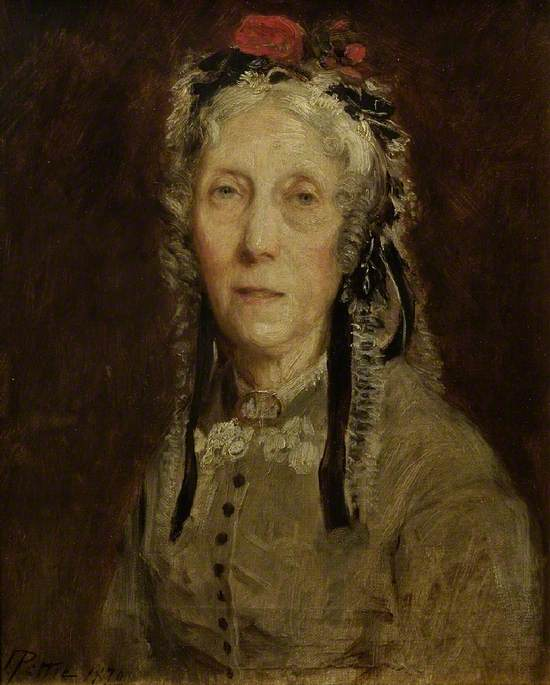
Mrs Bossom, 1870

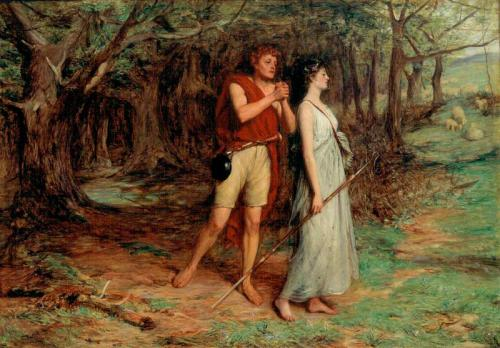
Silvius and Phoebe

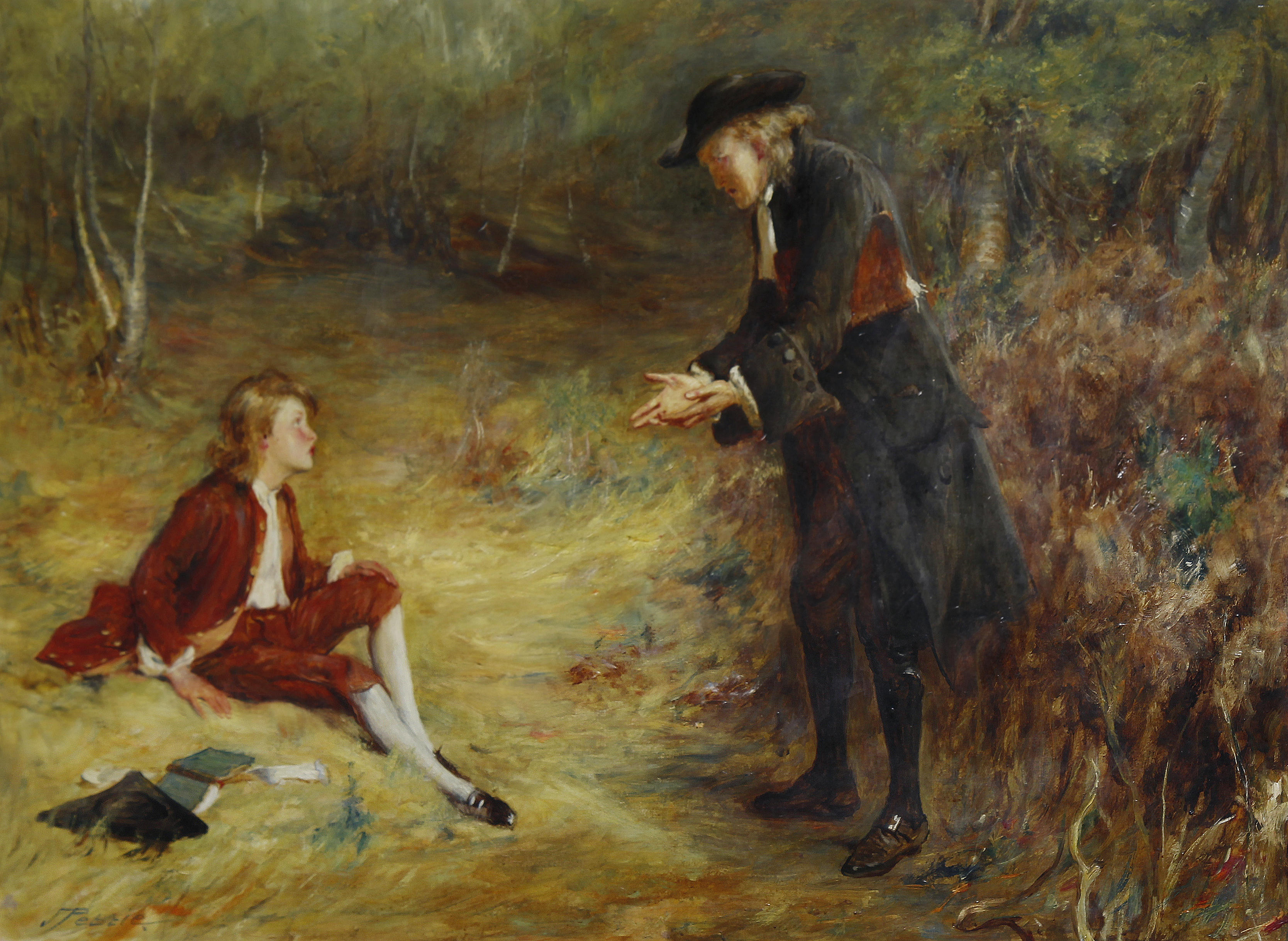
Sketch of Eugene Aram and the Scholar

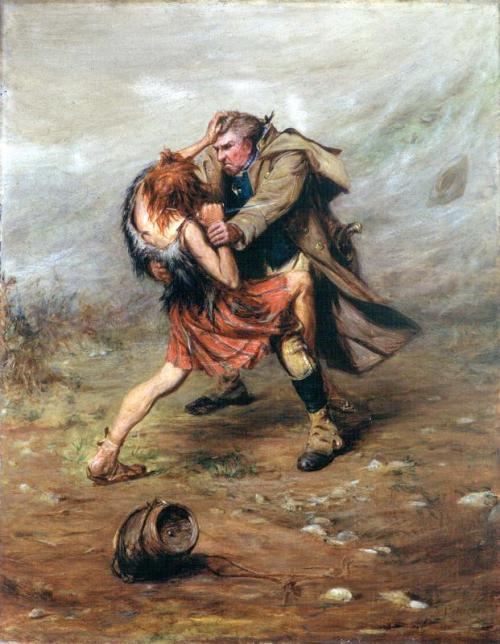
Tussle For The Keg

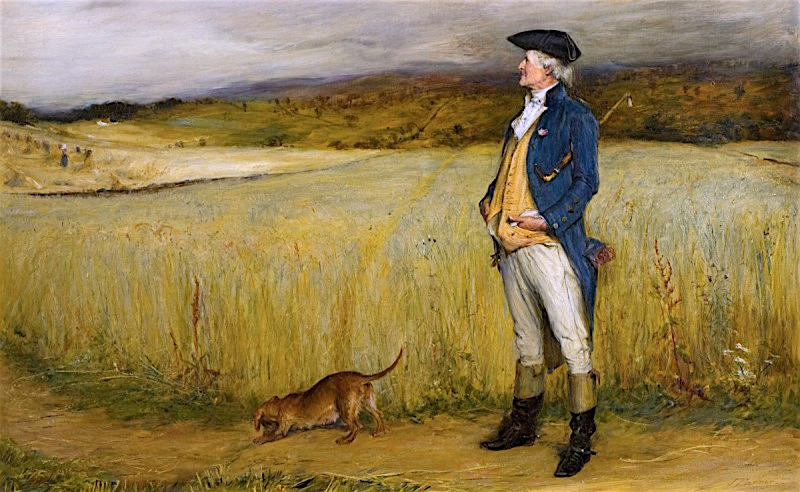
The Laird, 1878

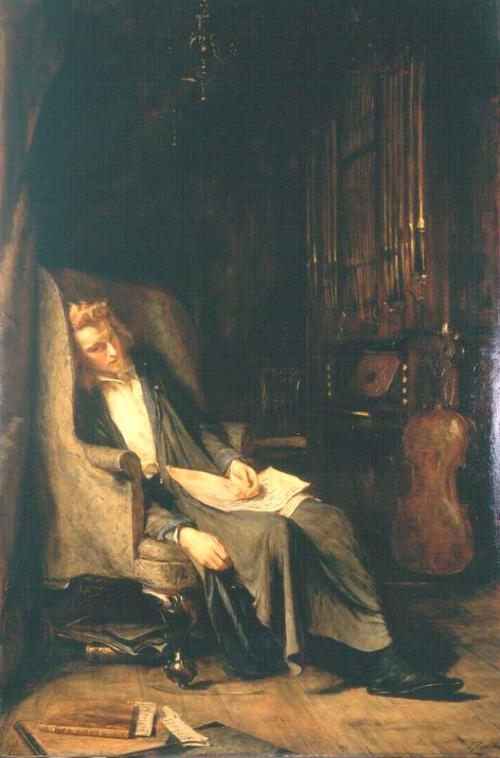
A Musician's Reverie

The Hour, 1878

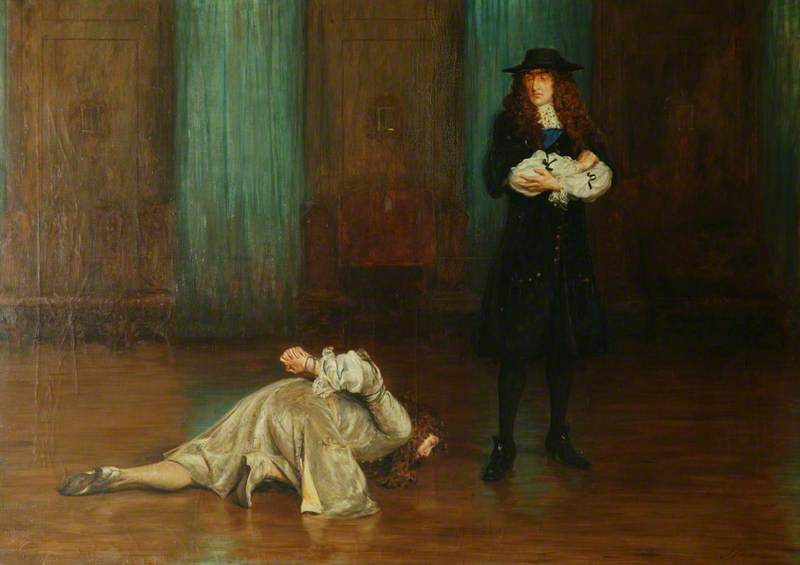
The Duke of Monmouth's Interview with James II, 1882

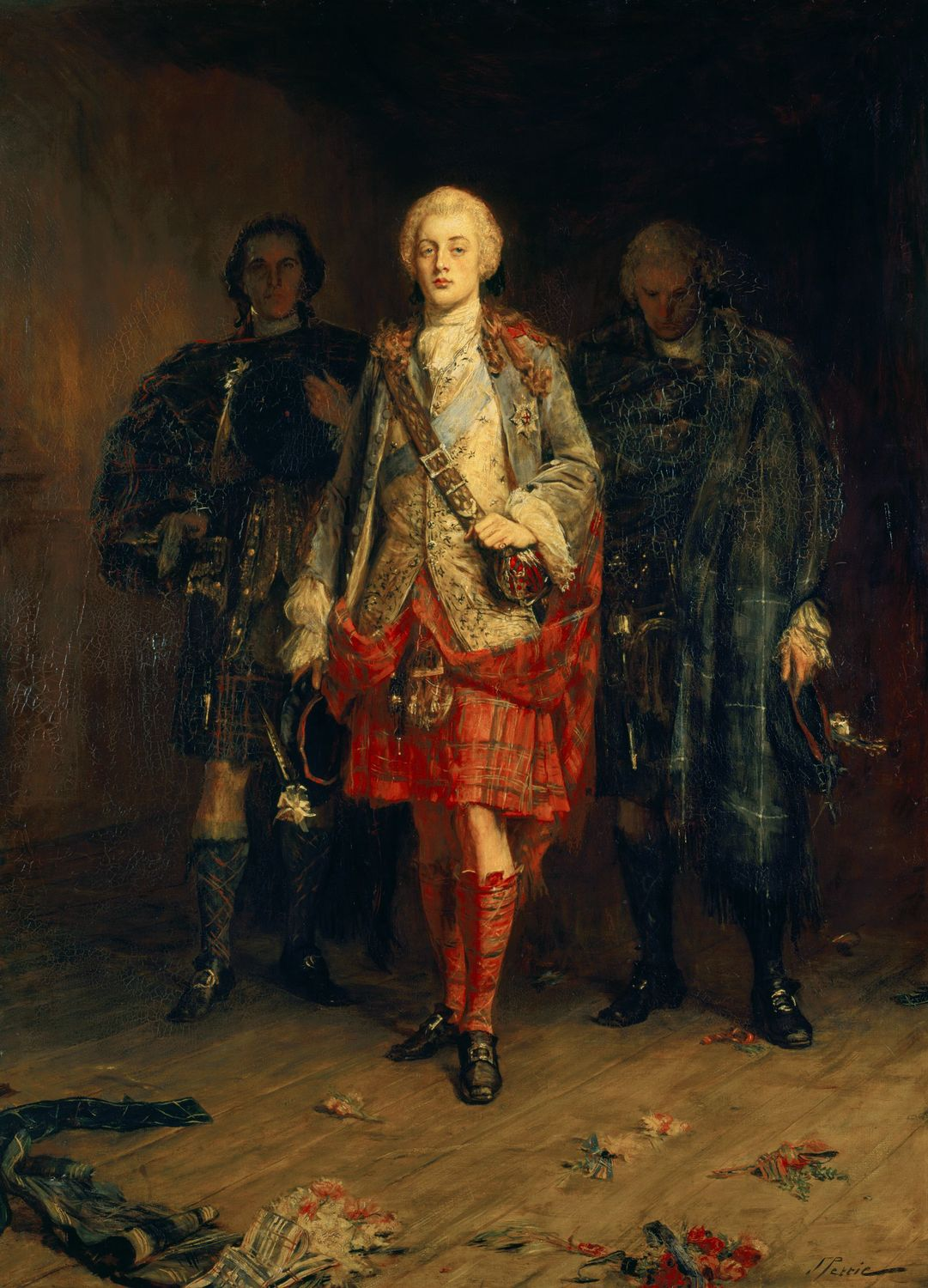
Bonnie Prince Charlie Entering the Ballroom at Holyroodhouse, 1892

== See also ==
- List of Scots
