= The Duke of Monmouth's Interview with James II =

Painting by John Pettie

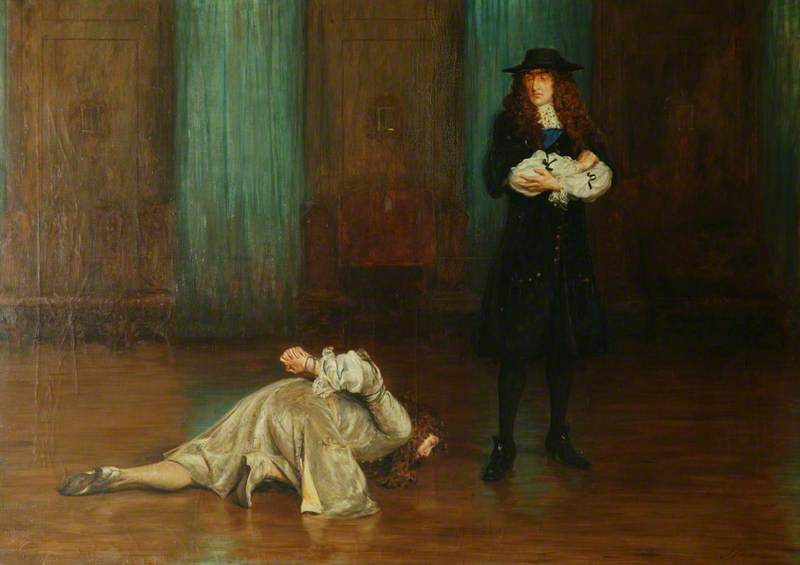
- Artist: John Pettie
- Year: 1882
- Type: Oil on canvas, history painting
- Dimensions: 93.4 cm × 130.5 cm (36.8 in × 51.4 in)
- Location: Manchester Art Gallery, Greater Manchester

The Duke of Monmouth's Interview with James II is an 1882 history painting by the British artist John Pettie. It depicts a scene from 1685 in the aftermath of Monmouth's Rebellion. Following his defeat at the Battle of Sedgemoor and subsequent capture the Duke of Monmouth requested an interview with his uncle James II who he had tried to overthrow. At Whitehall Palace in London, he prostrates himself to beg for clemency. The king refused his plea and Monmouth was beheaded at Tower Hill on 15 July 1685.

Pettie was known for painting scenes from British history. He drew inspiration for this picture from The History of England from the Accession of James the Second by Thomas Babington Macaulay. The painting was displayed at the Royal Academy Exhibition of 1882 held at Burlington House in London. Today it is in the collection of the Manchester Art Gallery, having been acquired in 1899.

== Bibliography ==
- Brennan, Laura. The Duke of Monmouth: Life and Rebellion. Pen & Sword Books, 2018.
- Pressly, William L. John Singleton Copley in England. Merrell Holberton, 1995.
- Strong, Roy C. Painting the Past: The Victorian Painter and British History. Pimlico, 2004.
