= Frederick Farrell =

British painter (1882–1935)

Fred Farrell
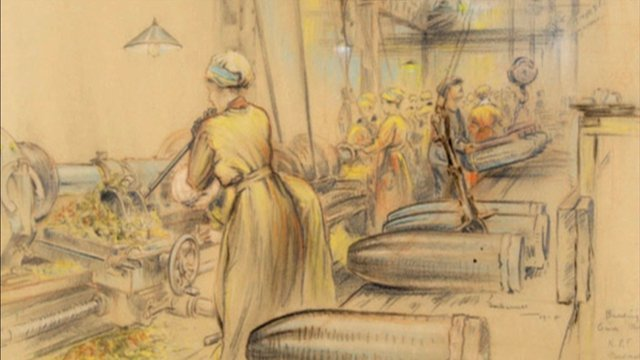
- Painting of women at work in a munitions factory
- Born: Frederick Arthur Farrell; 2 November 1882; Cowcaddens, Glasgow, Scotland
- Died: 22 April 1935 (aged 52); Largs, Ayrshire, Scotland
- Occupations: Civil engineer; Artist
- Known for: War art

Frederick Arthur Farrell (2 November 1882 – 22 April 1935) was a British artist who served as the city of Glasgow's official war artist during World War I. Glasgow was the only city to appoint an artist to such a position.

Farrell was born in 1882 to John Farrell and Margaret Lawson Farrell. His father was a school board officer at the time of his birth and later curator at the Trades House in Glasgow.

Farrell trained as a civil engineer while apprenticed to his brother. As an artist, he was self-taught, and worked in watercolour, as well as making etchings.

He was enlisted into the army as a sapper in June 1916, but was discharged six months later after developing a gastric ulcer.

Following his appointment as a war artist, he went to Flanders, Belgium, in November 1917, and spent three weeks there, painting Highland Light Infantry battalions. The next year he drew the 51st (Highland) Division in France.

He died in 1935 of pneumonia.

An exhibition of his work, the first since 1920, Fred A. Farrell: Glasgow's War Artist, was held at The People's Palace, Glasgow in 2014.

== Bibliography ==
- Munro, Neil (1920). "The 51st (Highland) division; war sketches". Internet Archive.
- Greenlees, Alan; Hayes, Fiona; Meacock, Joanna; Roberts, Mark (2014). Fred A. Farrell: Glasgow's War Artist. Glasgow: Philip Wilson Publishers Ltd. ISBN 9781781300275.
