= Sans Neige =

Painting by Joan Mitchell

- Sans Neige
- Artist: Joan Mitchell
- Year: 1969
- Medium: Oil on canvas (Triptych)
- Movement: Abstract Expressionism, New York School
- Dimensions: 259.72 cm × 500.38 cm (102.25 in × 197 in)
- Location: Carnegie Museum of Art, Pittsburgh
- Accession: 70.46.4.A-.C

Sans Neige is a 1969 oil on canvas triptych painting by the American New York School abstract expressionist artist Joan Mitchell. It is in the permanent collection of the Carnegie Museum of Art in Pittsburgh.

SFMOMA, in their catalogue for the recent large scale survey of Mitchell's work, describes it as [going] "from glowing passages of wet paint and dripping laundry to thickly applied impasto, or paint that gives a deep texture and of jumps off a surface".

This 16.5 foot wide work was Mitchell's first large scale triptych. It was not exhibited for over thirty years until the recent large scale survey of the artist's work.
