= Prasa-Książka-Ruch =

Communist Poland state-owned newspaper monopoly

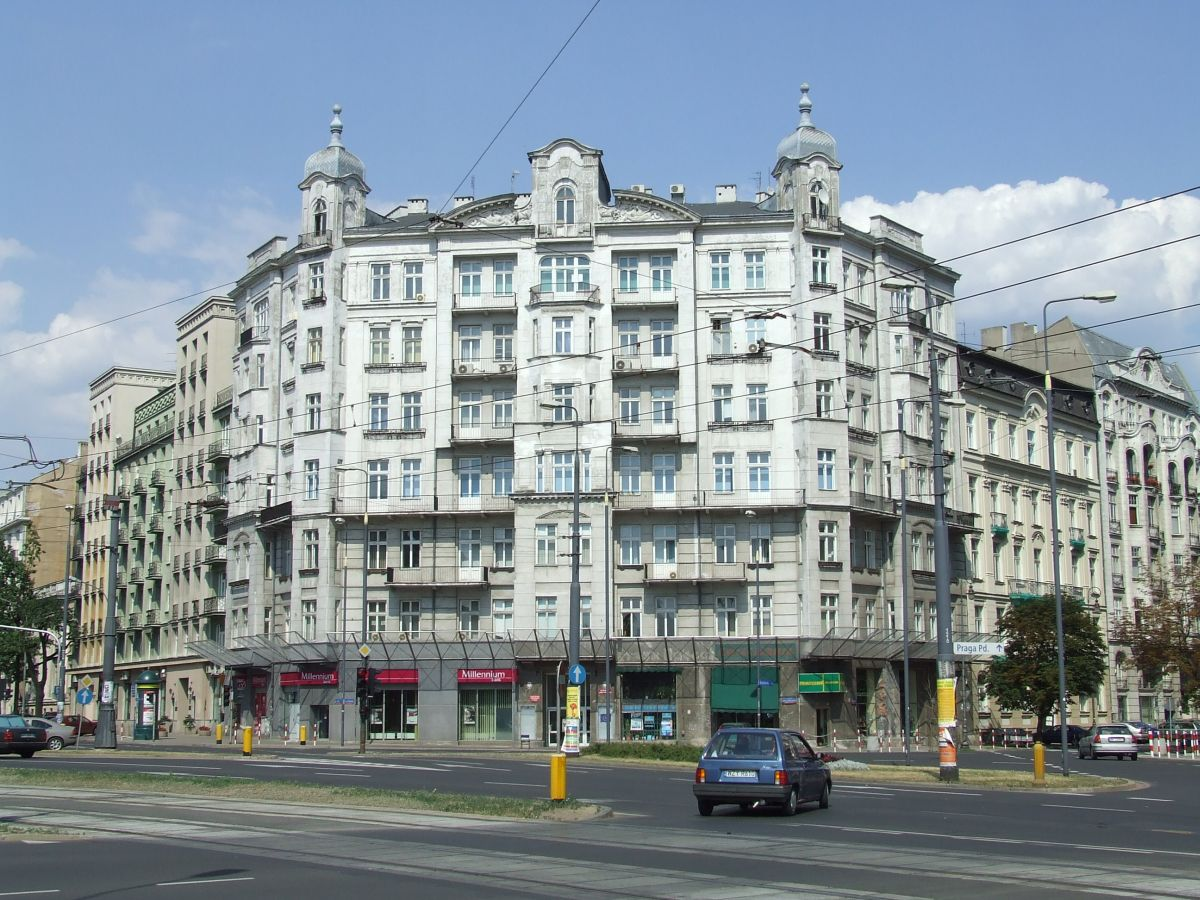
Property once owned by the RSW Prasa-Książka-Ruch at Ujazdów Avenue in Śródmieście, Warsaw with office space for lease

The RSW Prasa-Książka-Ruch literally the Workers' Publishing Cooperative abbreviated to RSW "Press-Book-Movement" (Polish: Robotnicza Spółdzielnia Wydawnicza "Prasa-Książka-Ruch"), was a state-owned newspaper monopoly in communist Poland founded on 1 January 1973 by the Polish United Workers' Party (PZPR). It operated a system of printing houses and distribution outlets (see also: Empik), and owned vast real estate including resort and recreation property also rented out.

== Operation ==
The RSW practically financed the Communist Party in the People's Republic of Poland throughout the 1970s and 1980s until the collapse of the Soviet empire. The company was exempt from paying taxes on its own revenue (in 1988 the RSW held back taxes amounting to 52 billion zlotys used for the exuberant bonuses of party officials, along with their political campaigns). The RSW was liquidated by the Act of Polish Parliament on 22 March 1990.
