= Fritz Burger-Mühlfeld =

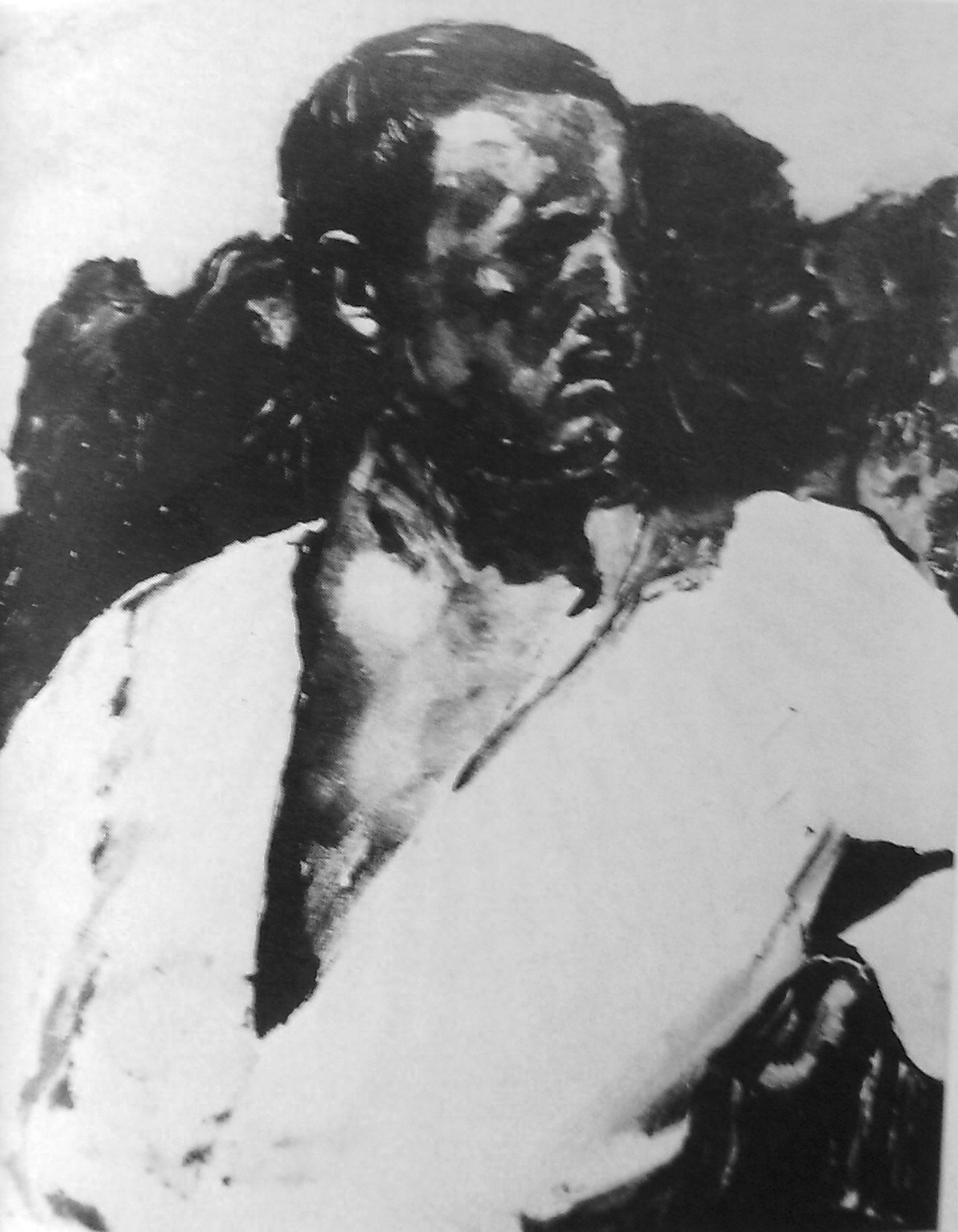
Fritz Burger-Mühlfeld (portrait by Albert Weisgerber, 1911)

Fritz Burger-Mühlfeld (3 March 1882 – 17 May 1969) was a German painter and graphic artist of the New Objectivity as well as, later, of Expressionism and Abstract Expressionism. Influences of Cubism and Constructivism are characteristic of his late work.

== Life ==
He was born in Augsburg. His parents ran the "Etiketten- und Plakatfabrik Augsburg, F. Burger" (Augsburg Label and Poster Factory, F. Burger). In 1901, Burger studied under Franz von Stuck at the Munich Academy of Fine Arts. There, he befriended Albert Weisgerber, who later painted his portrait (1911). To distinguish himself from the painter of the same name, Fritz Burger (1867–1927), and the art historian Fritz Burger (1877–1916), he appended his mother's maiden name to his own. In 1906, he participated in the Munich Secession exhibition for the first time.

In 1909, he became head of the graphic arts class at the Hanover School of Arts and Crafts. Works from this period reflect the style of New Objectivity. He served as a soldier in World War I from 1914 to 1916; his self-portrait as a soldier dates from 1916. In 1917, he founded the Hanover Sezession. Exhibitions at the Kestner-Gesellschaft followed. He completed his habilitation in 1918. During the 1920s, his works were exhibited in Munich and Berlin.

The growing influence of Expressionism and Cubism on Burger-Mühlfeld’s work led to his paintings being stigmatized as "degenerate art" ("entartete Kunst"). In 1937, as part of the Nazi "Degenerate Art" campaign, two of his panel paintings—Abstract Composition (oil behind glass, 1923) and In the Theater—were confiscated from the Provincial Museum in Hanover. Both were displayed at the Degenerate Art exhibition. Their whereabouts remain unknown.

From 1942, Burger-Mühlfeld served as a soldier in the Second World War. He gave up his teaching career in 1947.

Burger-Mühlfeld died on 17 May 1969 at the age of 87 in Hanover.

== Work ==
Some of his works are part of the Robert Simon Collection at the Kunstmuseum Celle. From November 2011 to February 2012, an extensive exhibition of his works was held at the Schaezlerpalais, organized by the Art Collections and Museums of his hometown, Augsburg.
