= Salon of 1882 =

1882 art exhibition in Paris

A Bar at the Folies-Bergère by Édouard Manet

The Salon of 1882 was an art exhibition held at the Palace of Industry in Paris between 1 May and 15 July 1882. it was annual Salon organised by the Académie des Beaux-Arts. It took place during the Belle Époque during the Republic. It should not be confused with the seventh Impressionist Exhibition held in the city the same year.

Despite his close association with the Impressionists Édouard Manet chose to exhibit at the Salon, which was more closely associated with Academic Art. A year before his death, he displayed one of his best known paintings 'A Bar at the Folies-Bergère, which features scene in the Parisian nightclub. Although widely praised and now considered his final masterpiece, critics at the time largely preferred his other submission Spring.

Paul Cézanne finally made his Salon debut with a painting of his father that he had first produced in 1866. Rinaldo Carnielo exhibited the sculpture Mozart Expiring. William Stott of Oldham and Frank O'Meara enjoyed success with landscapes painted en plein air in the village of Grez-sur-Loing. James McNeill Whistler displayed his Portrait of Lady Meux as well as three etchings of scenes in Venice.

== Gallery ==
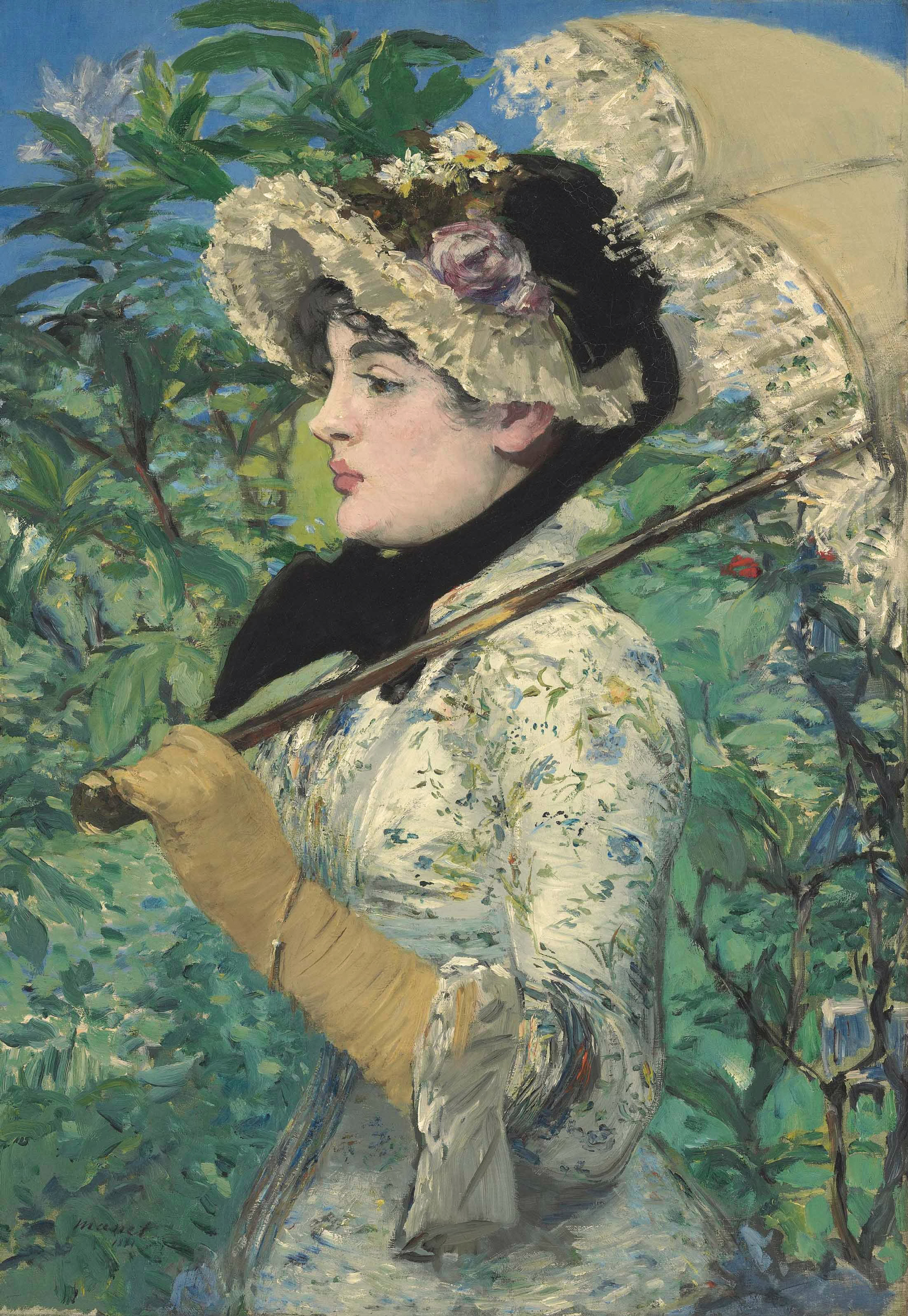
Spring by Édouard Manet

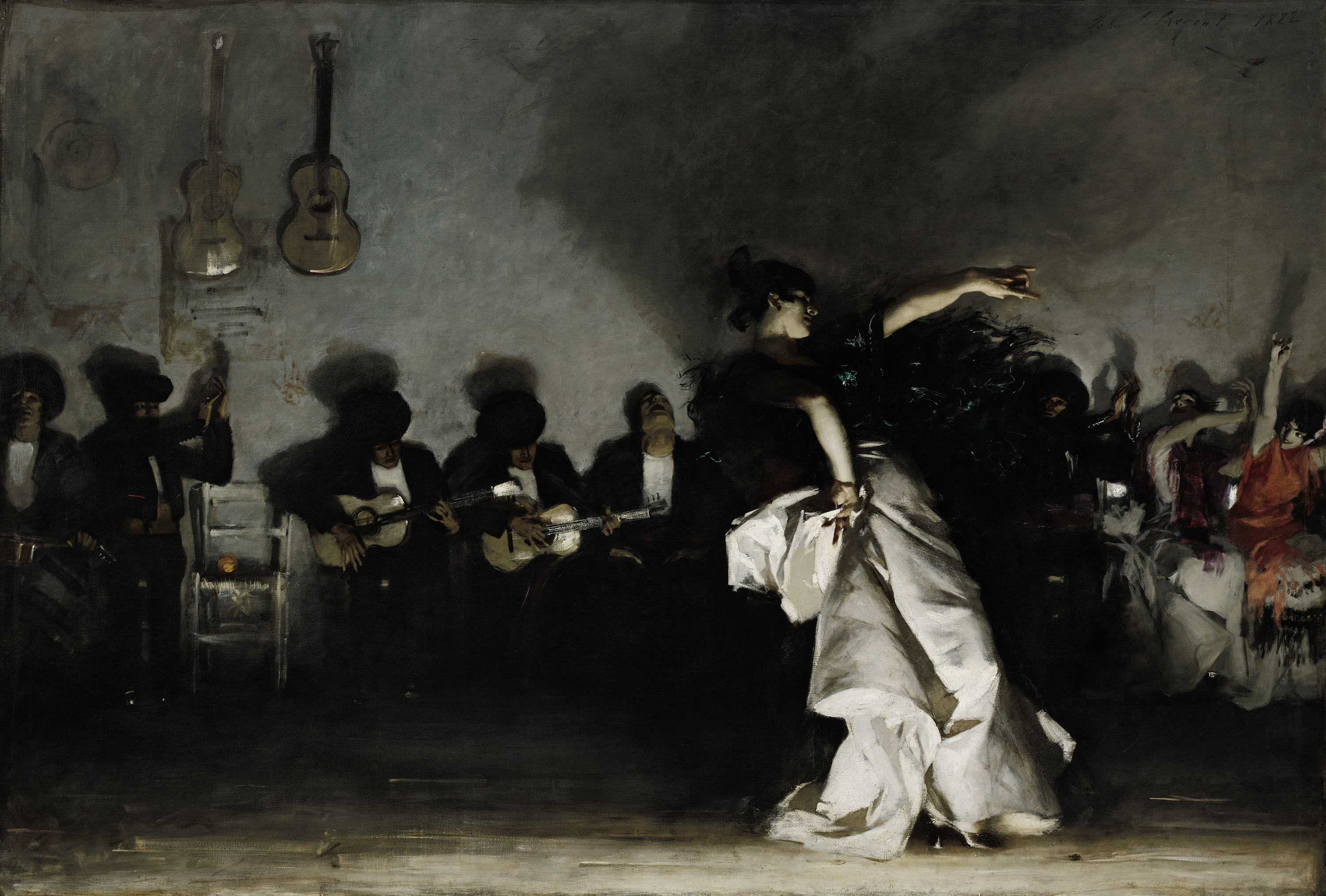
El Jaleo by John Singer Sargent

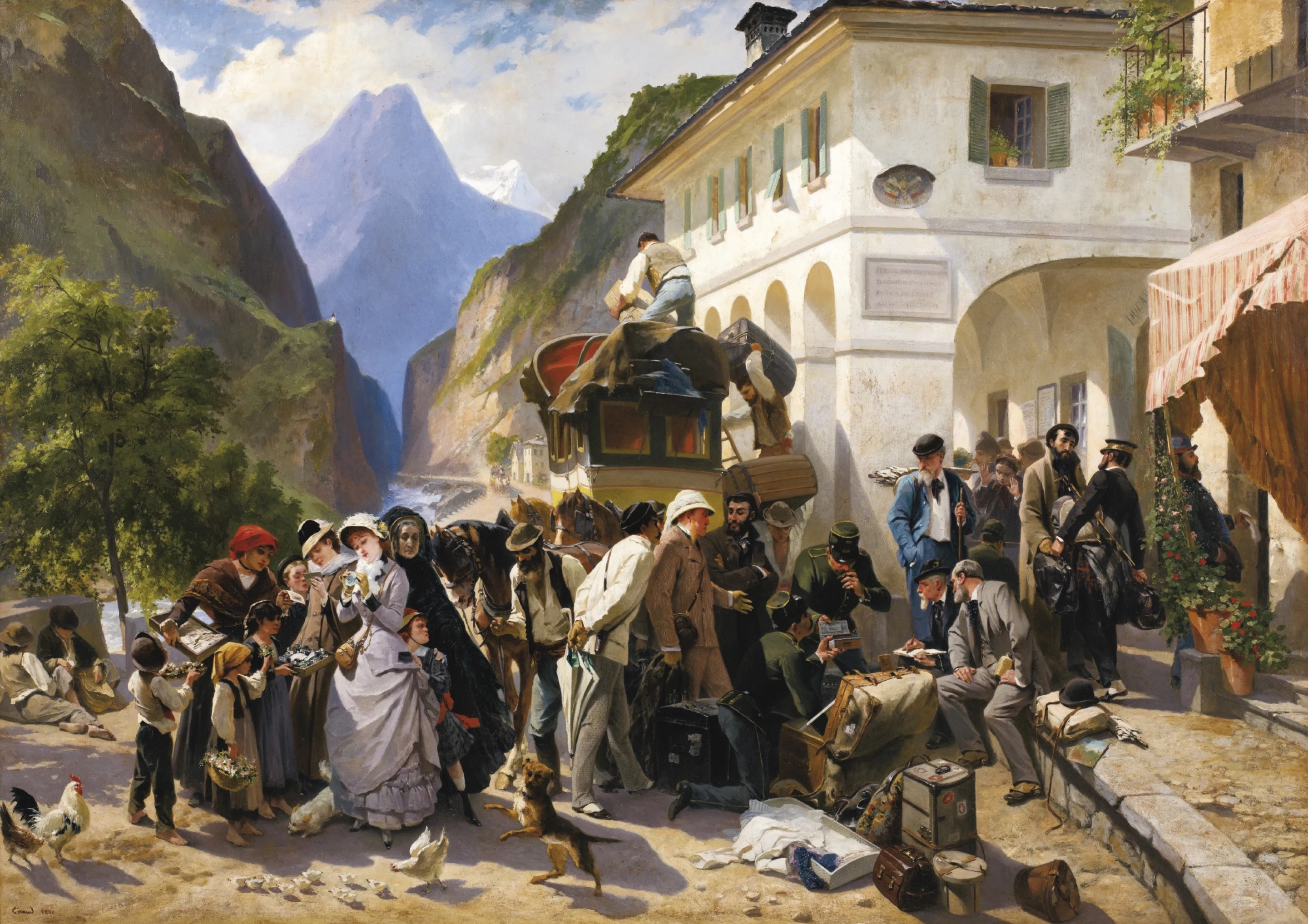
Italian Customs at the Simplon Pass by Eugène Giraud

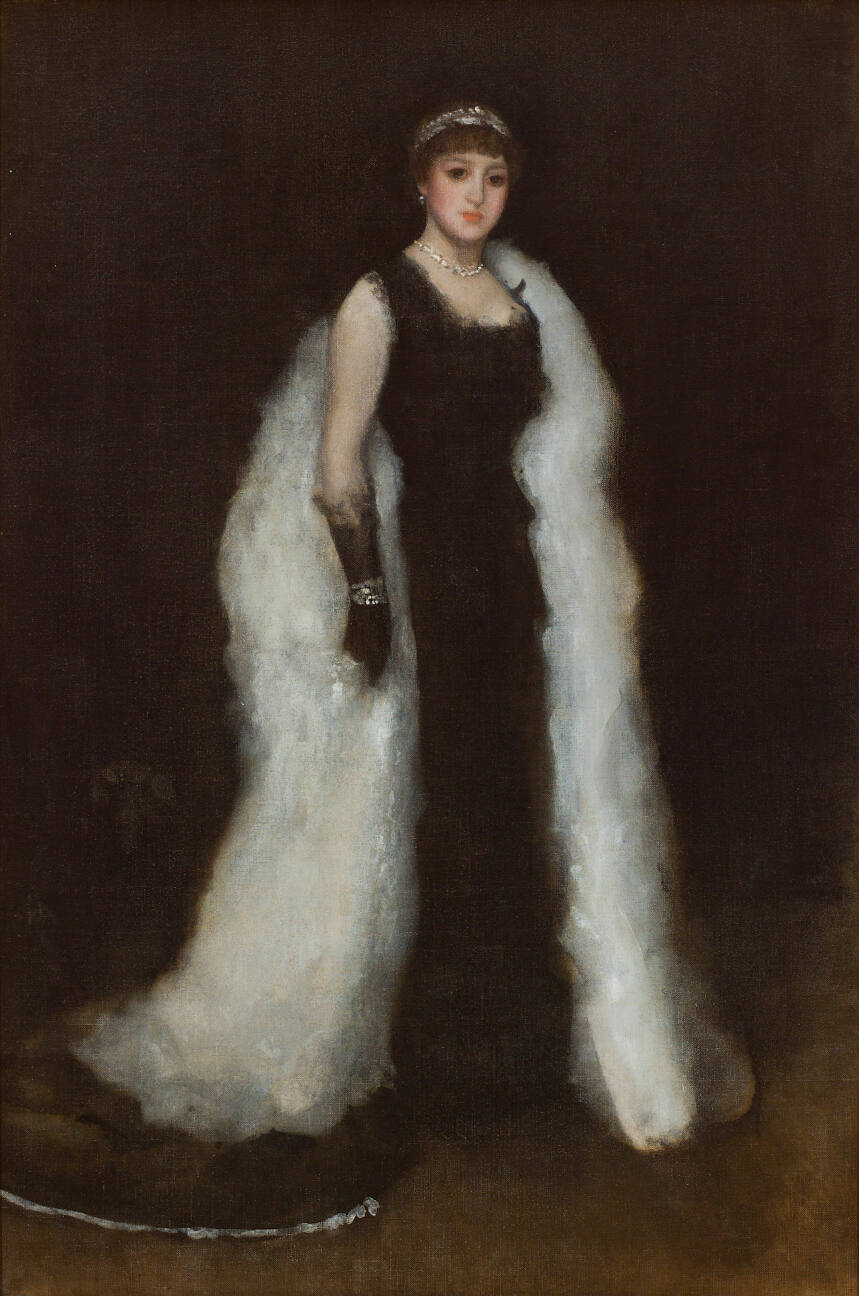
Portrait of Lady Meux by James McNeill Whistler

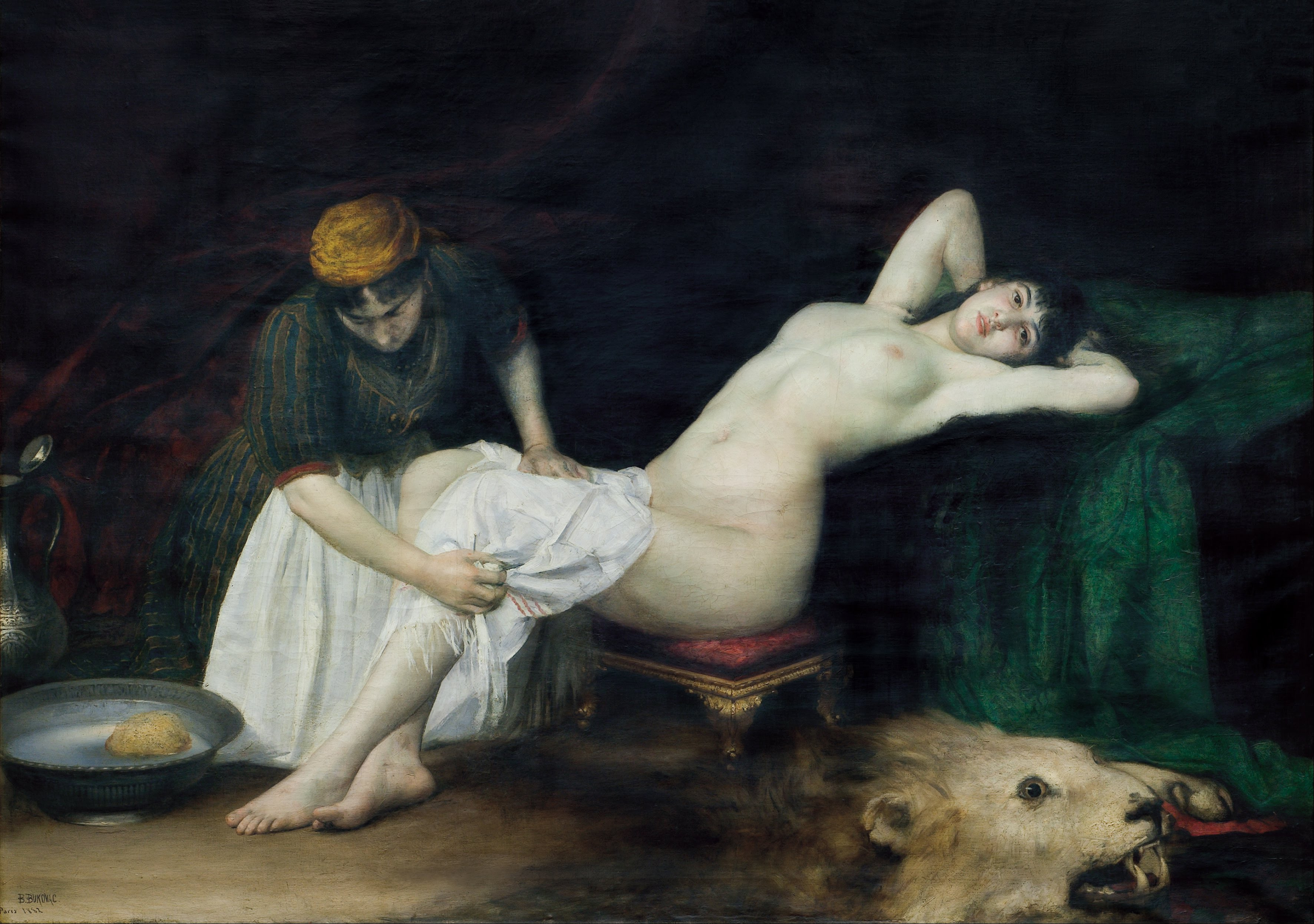
La Grande Iza by Vlaho Bukovac

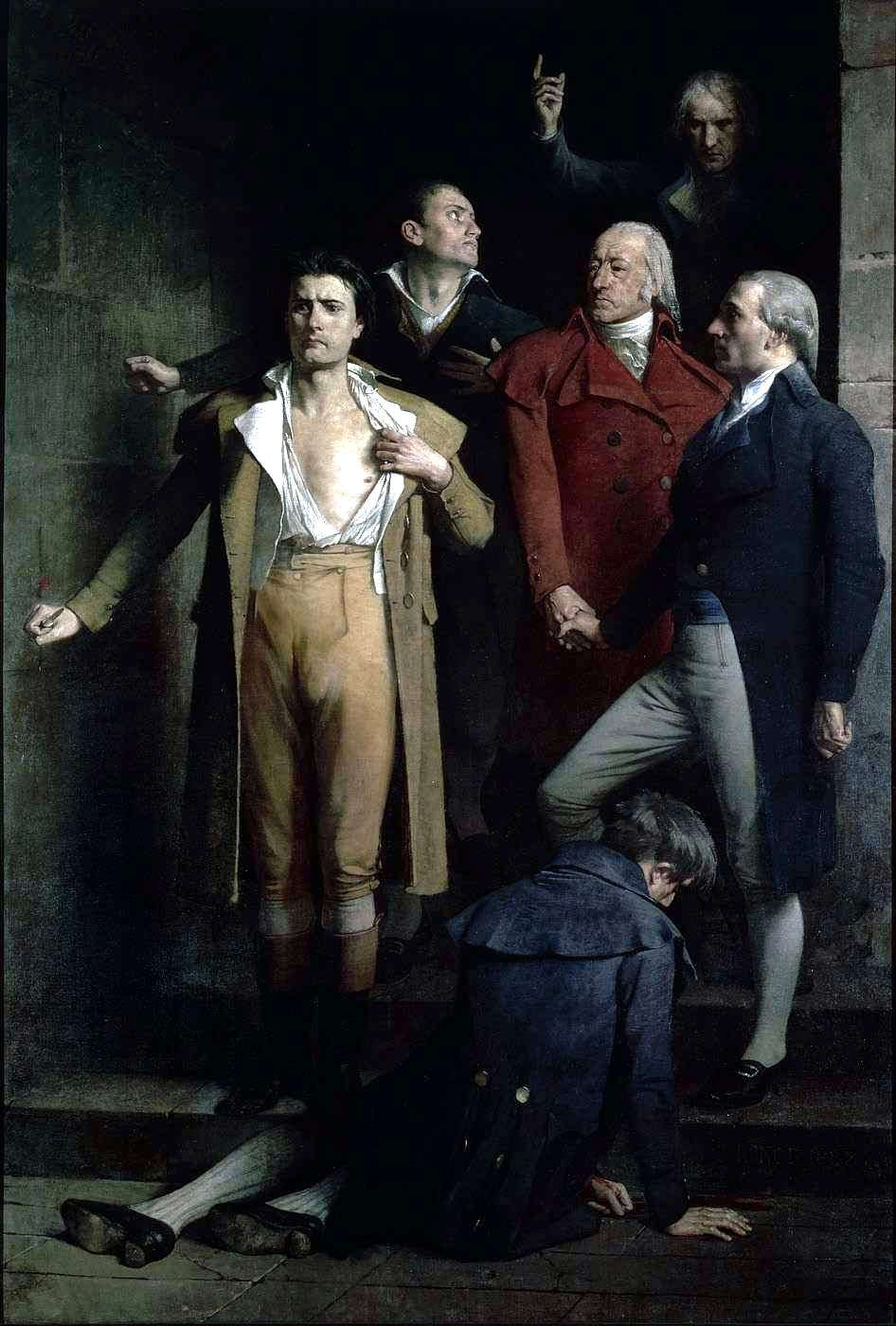
The Last Montagnards by Charles Ronot

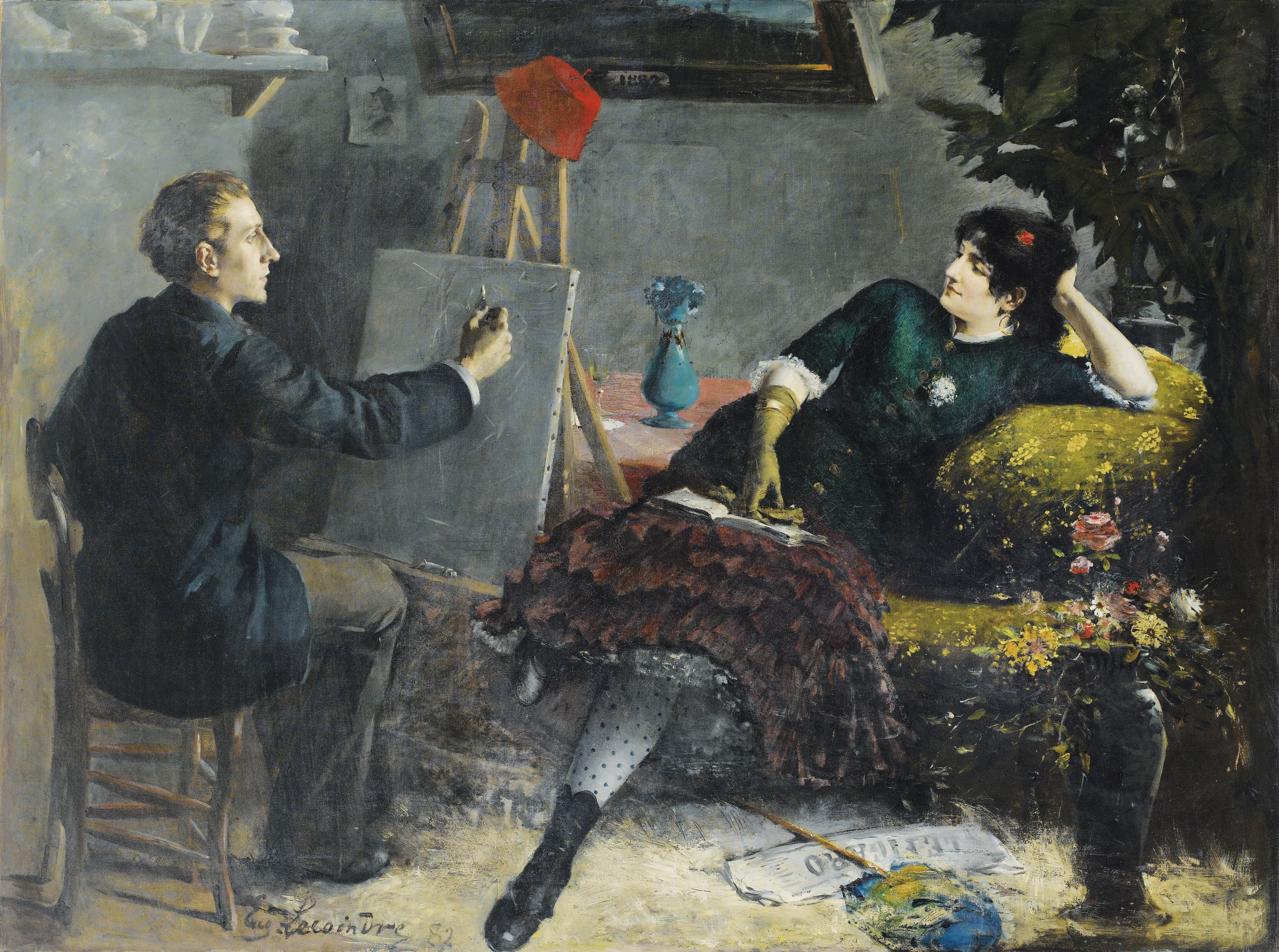
In the Studio by Eugène Lecoindre

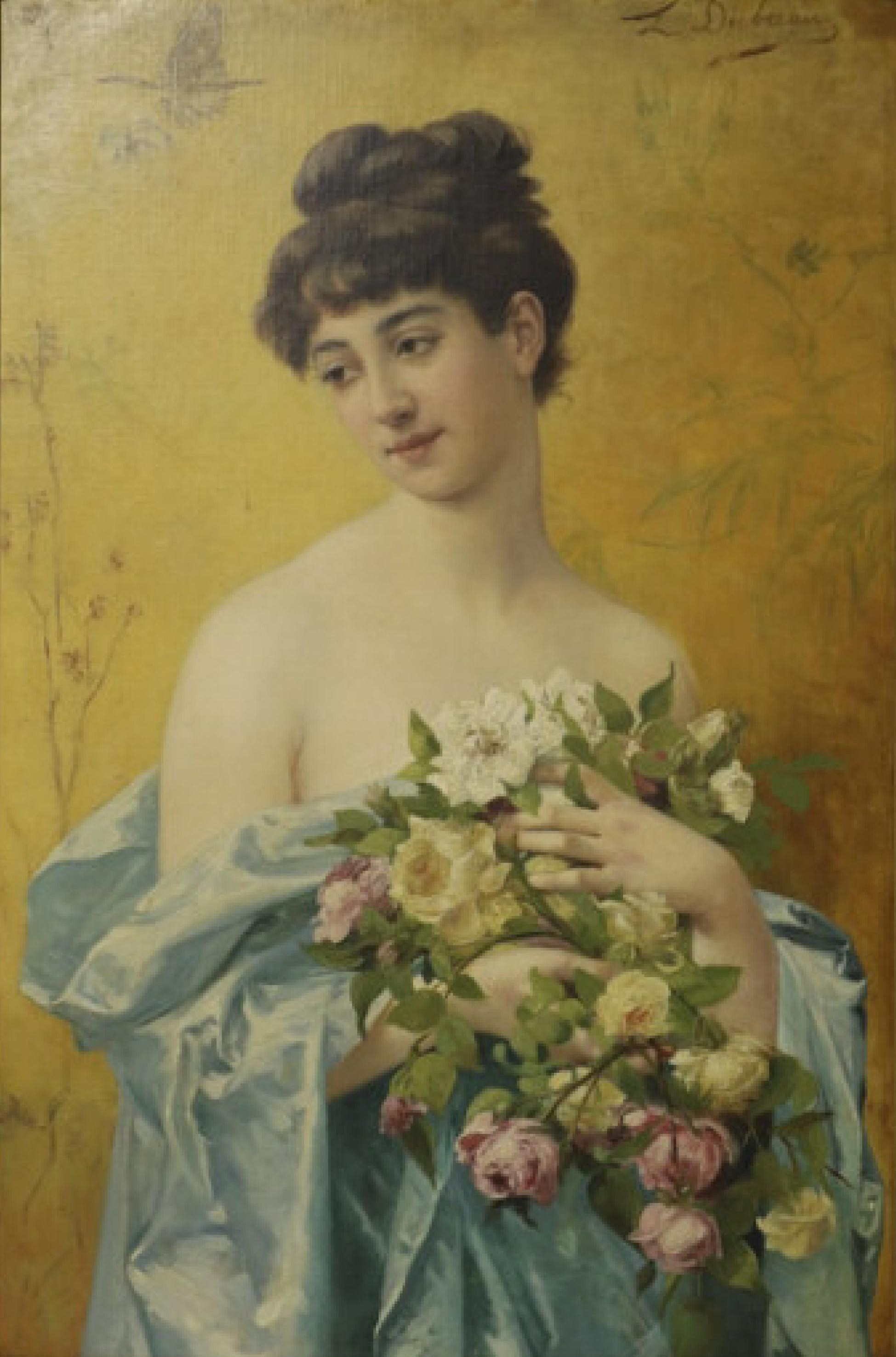
Printemps by Louise Ward

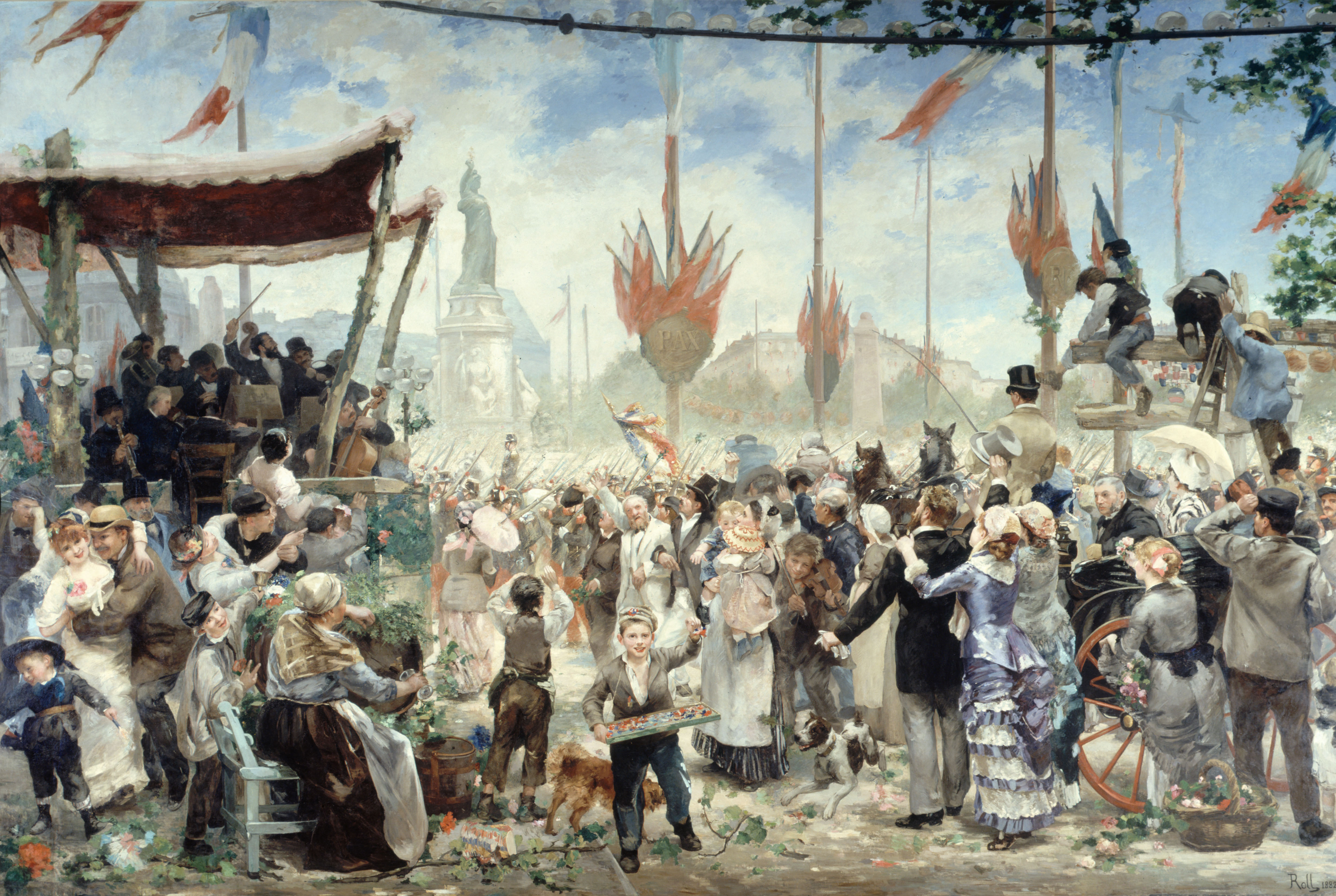
14 Juillet 1880, inauguration du monument à la République by Alfred Philippe Roll

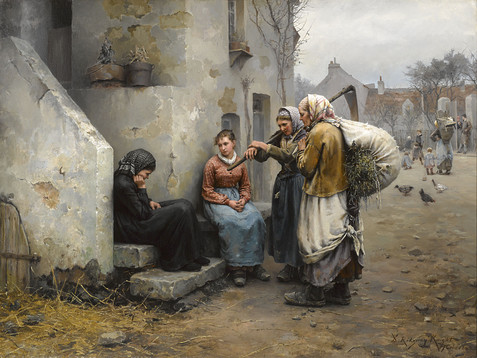
Un Deuil by Daniel Ridgway Knight

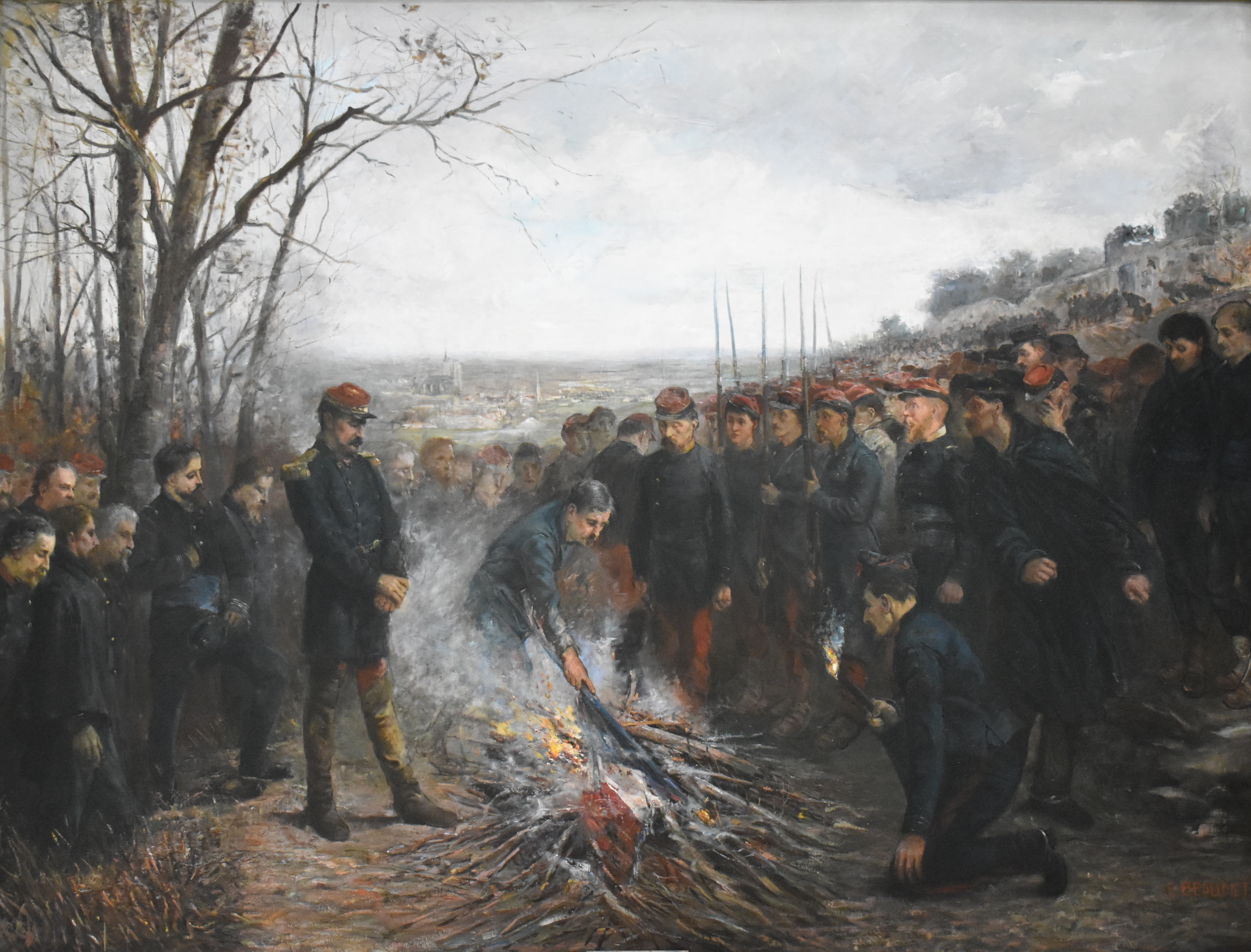
General Lapasset Burning His Flags by Henri-Charles-Etienne Dujardin-Beaumetz

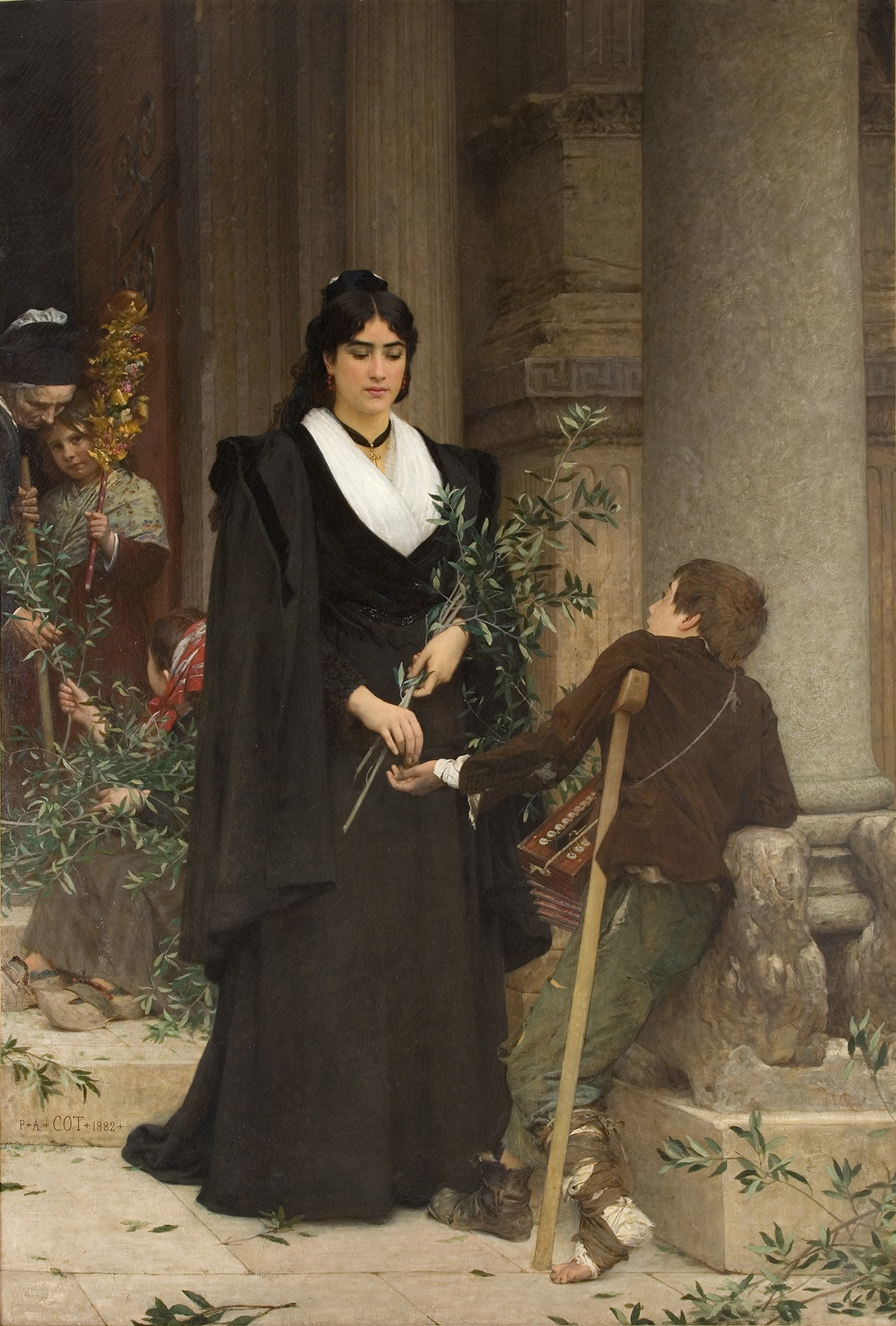
Mireille Giving Alms at Saint-Trophime by Pierre Auguste Cot

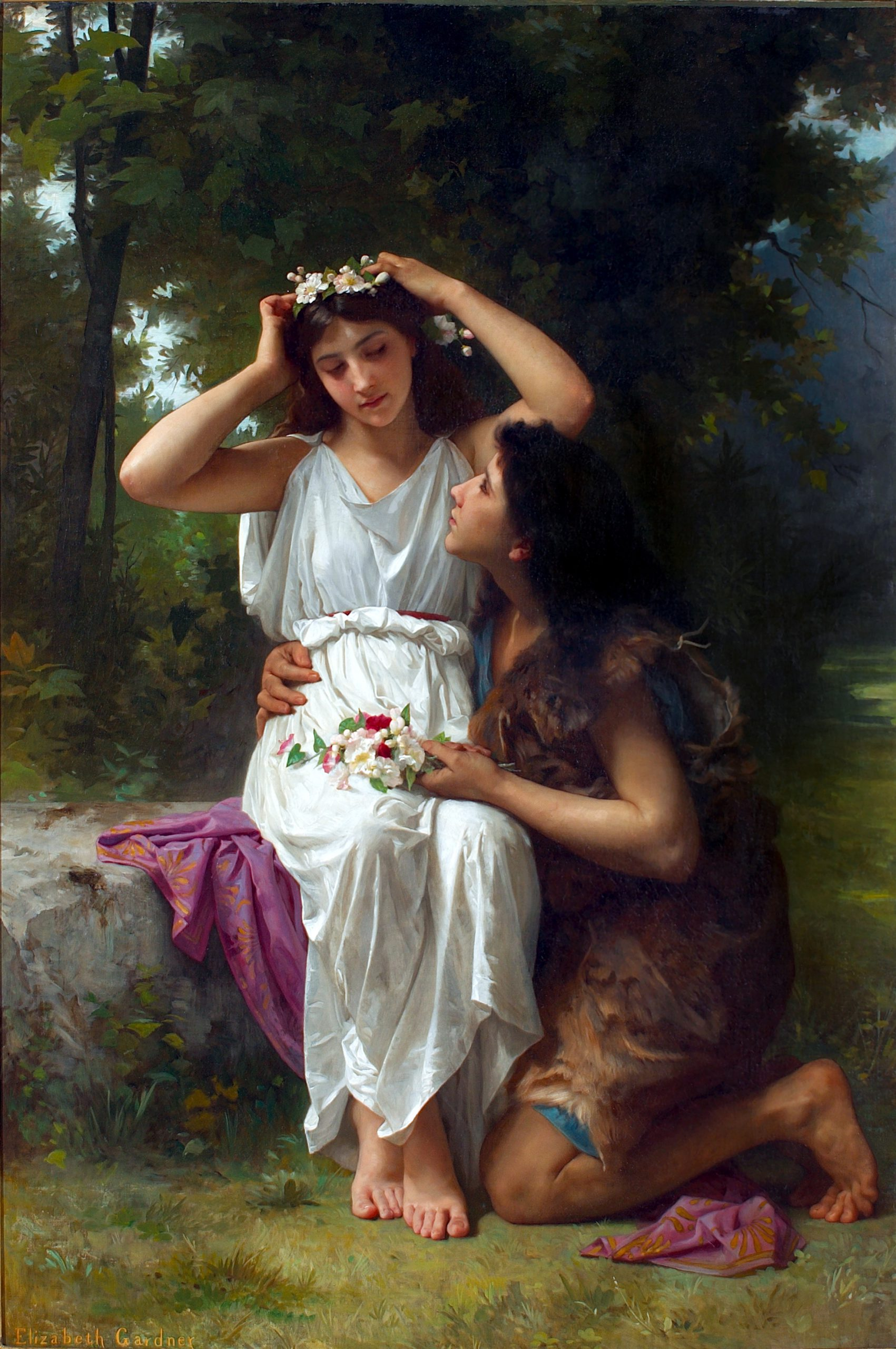
Daphnis and Chloe by Elizabeth Jane Gardner

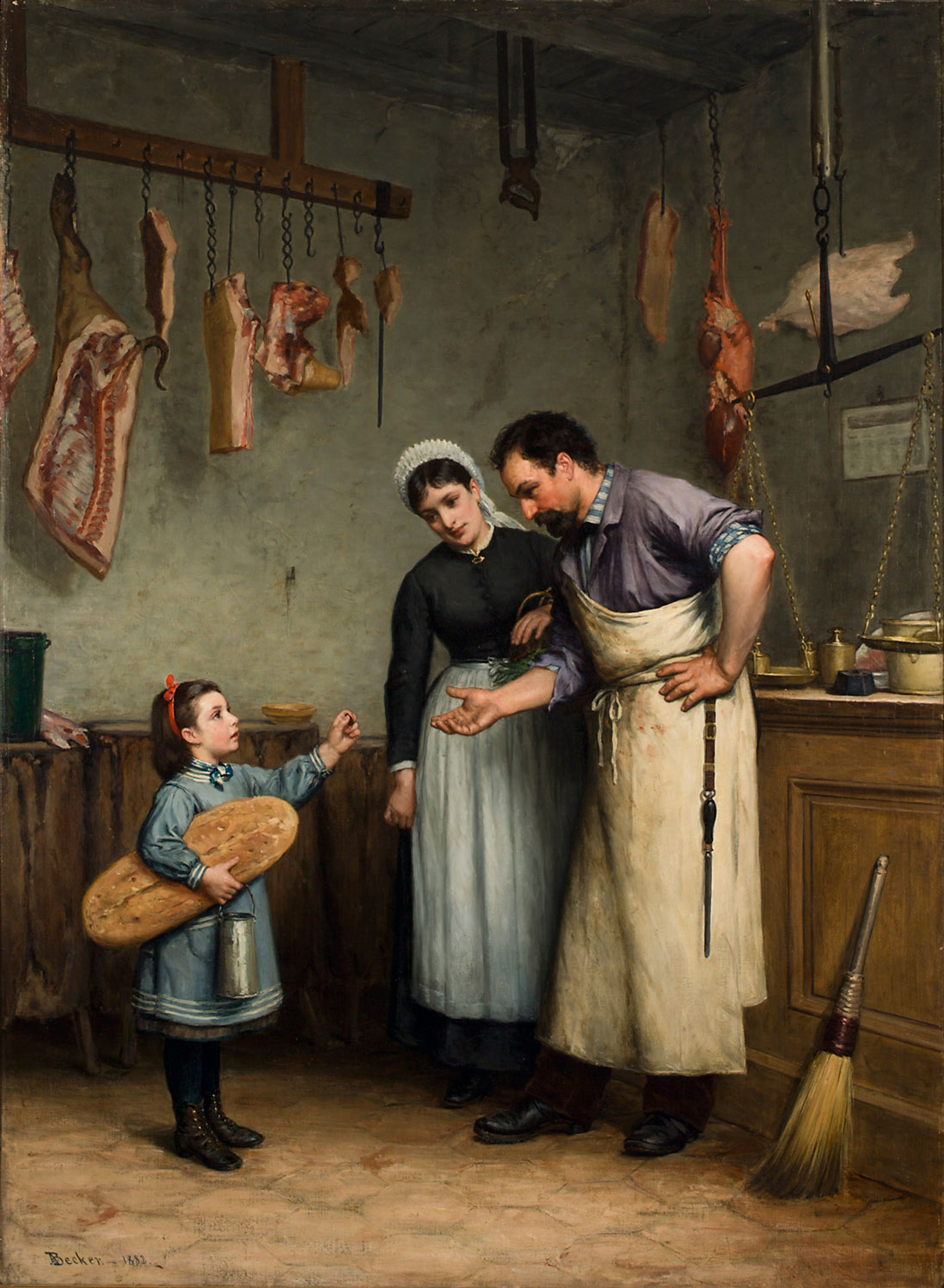
Something for the Cat by Adolf von Becker

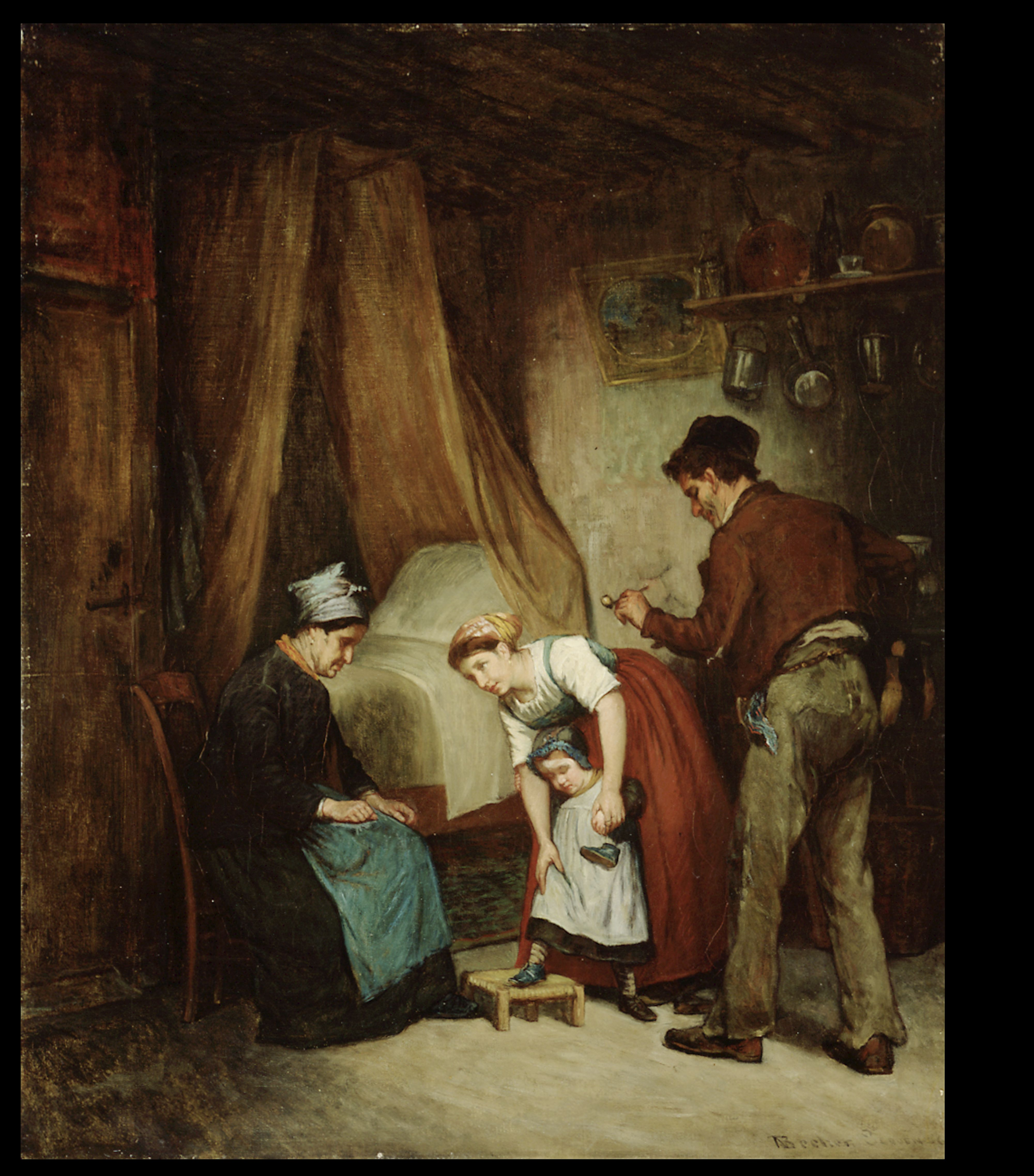
A French Cobbler by Adolf von Becker

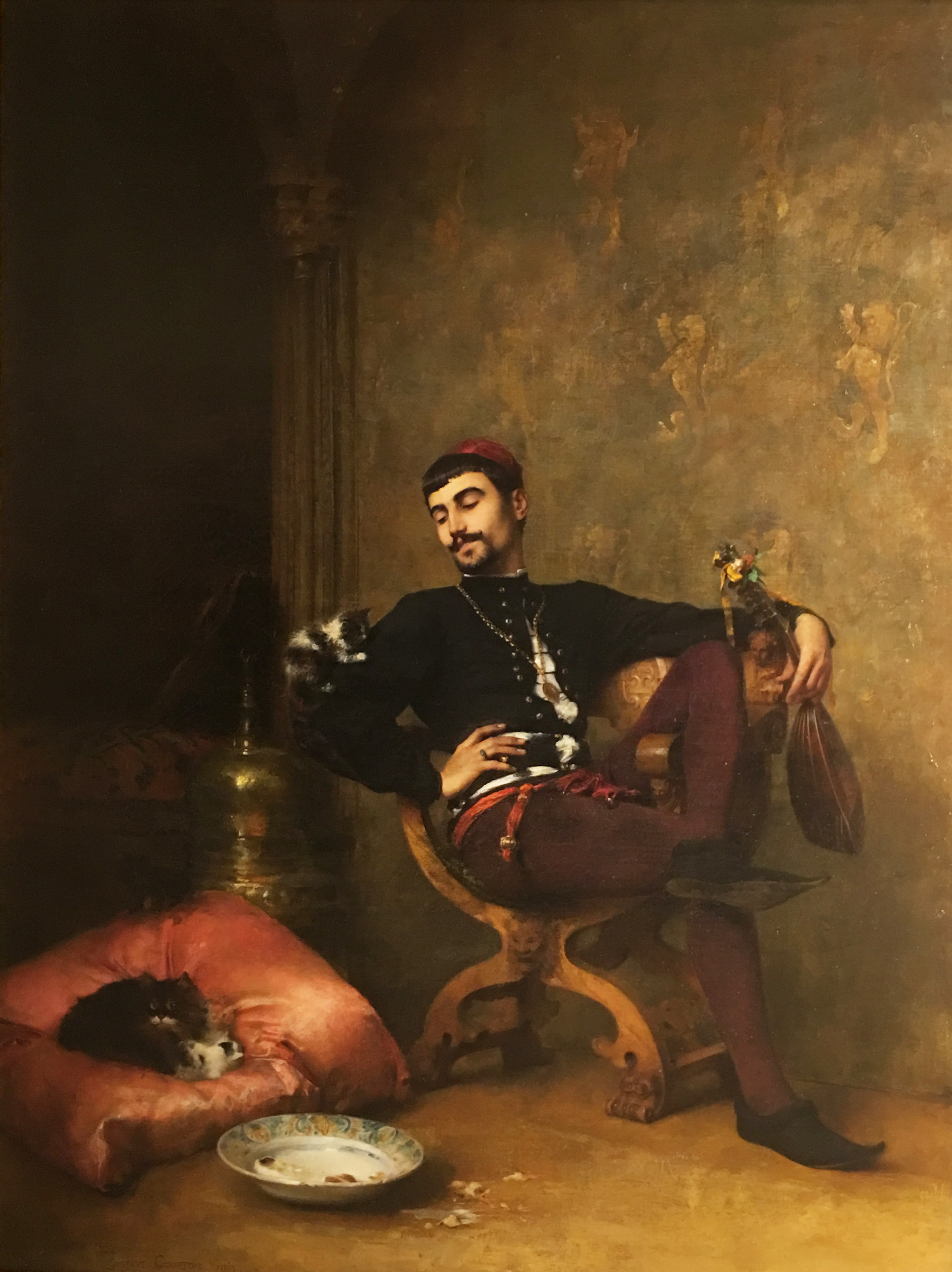
Young Florentin Playing with Cats by Gustave-Claude-Etienne Courtois

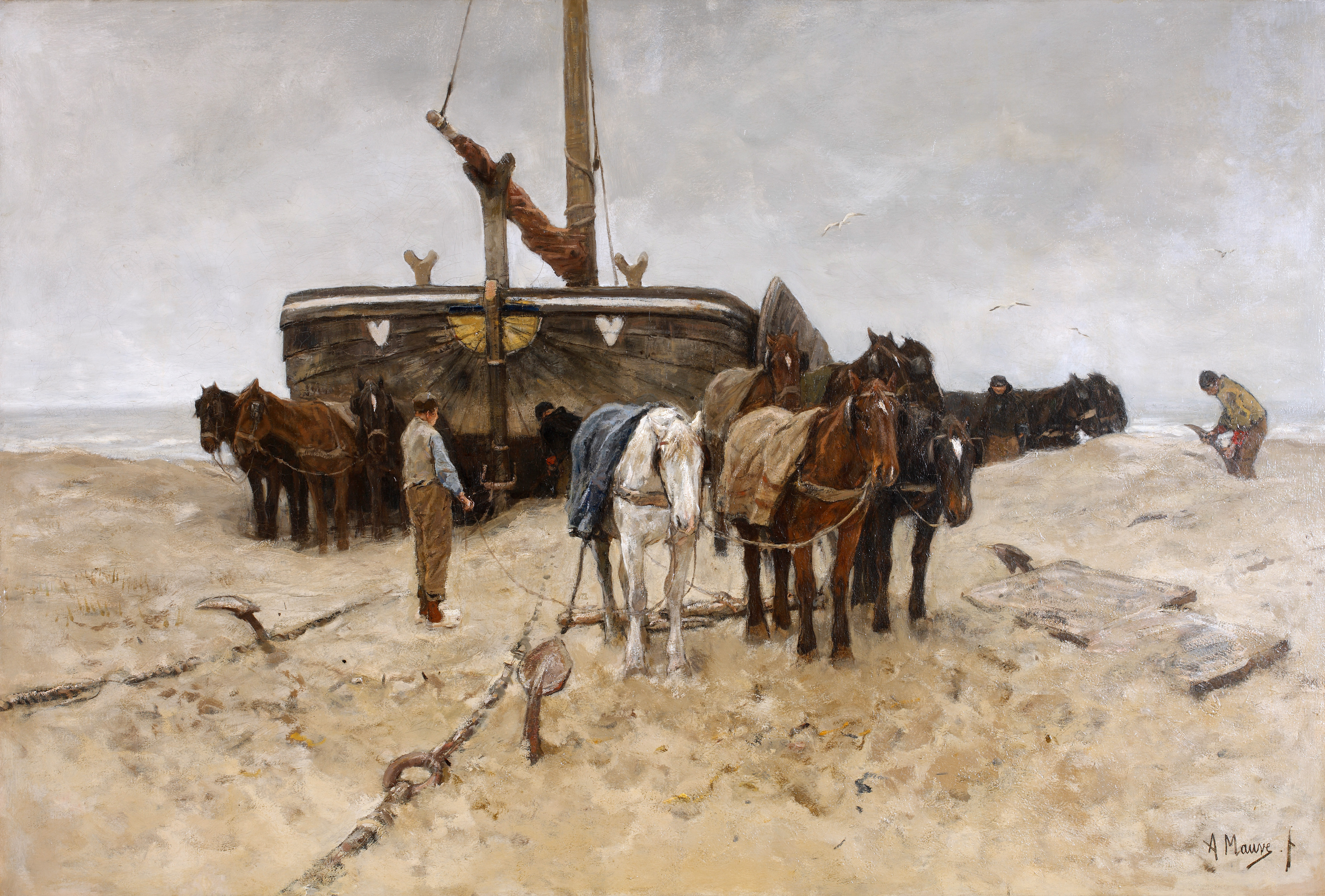
Fishing Boat on the Beach by Anton Mauve

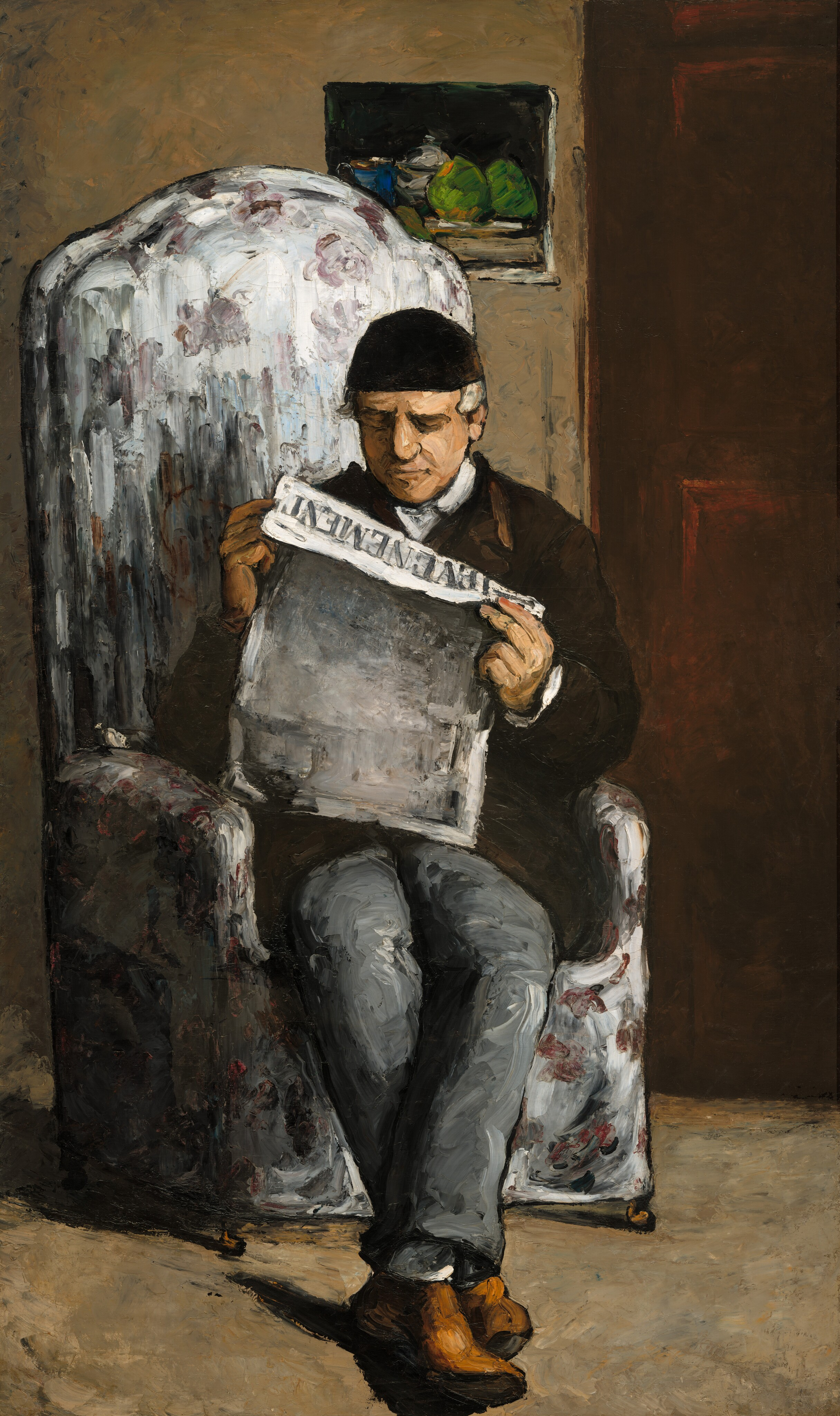
The Artist's Father, Reading "L'Événement by Paul Cézanne

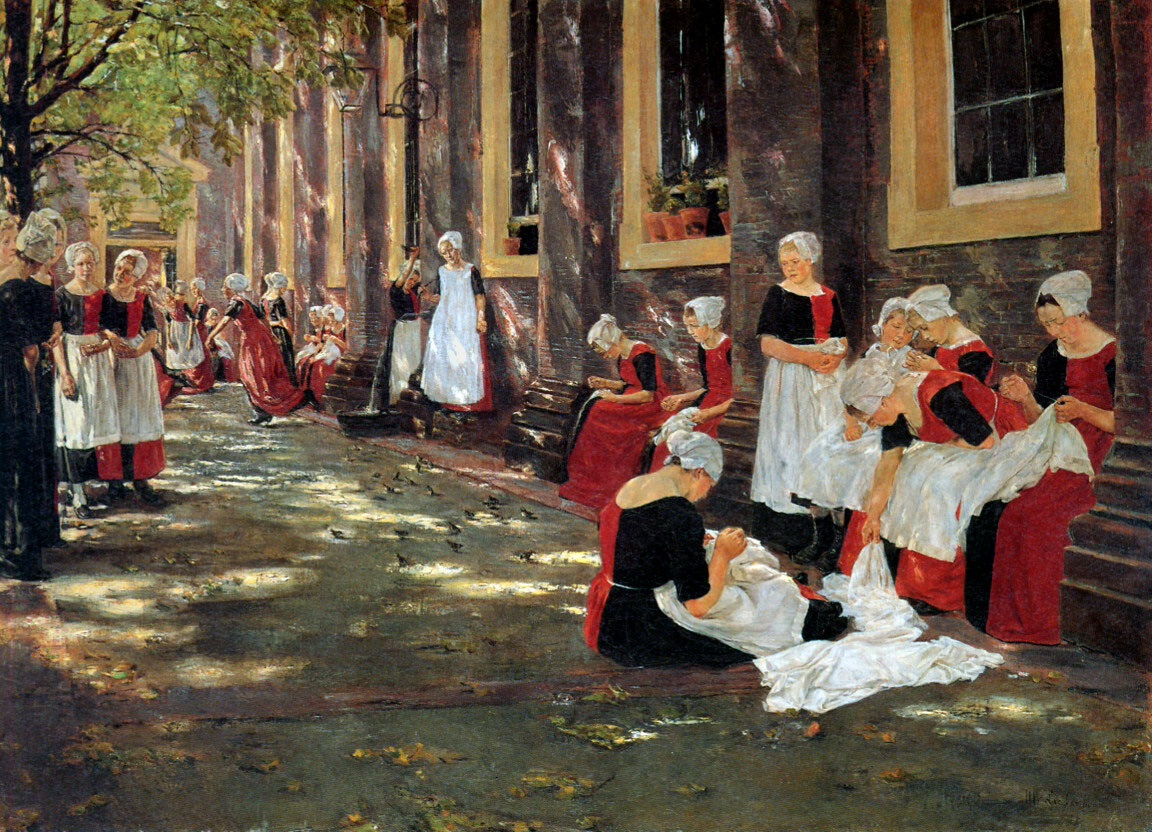
Recreation Time in the Amsterdam Orphanage by Max Liebermann

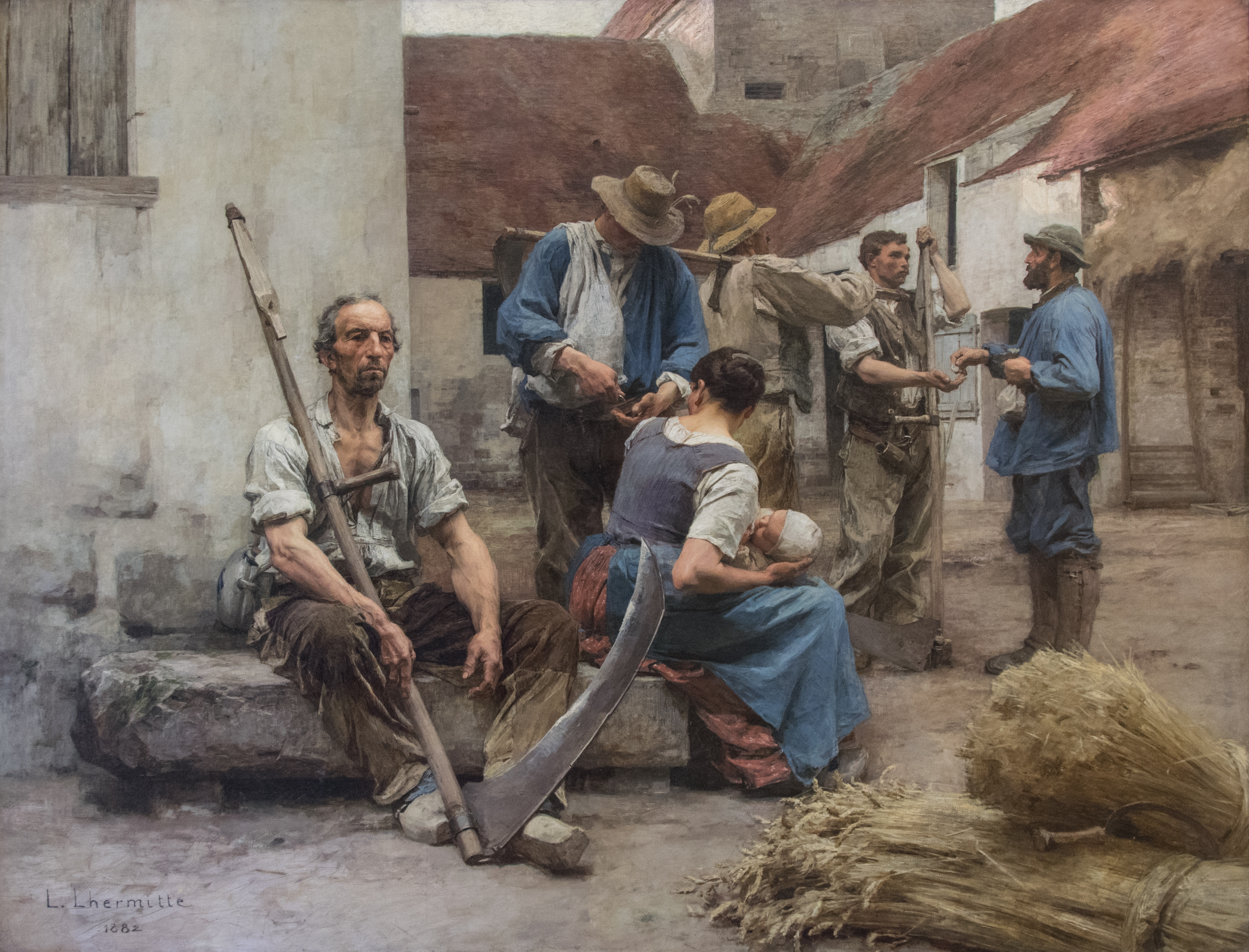
La paye des moissonneurs by Léon Lhermitte

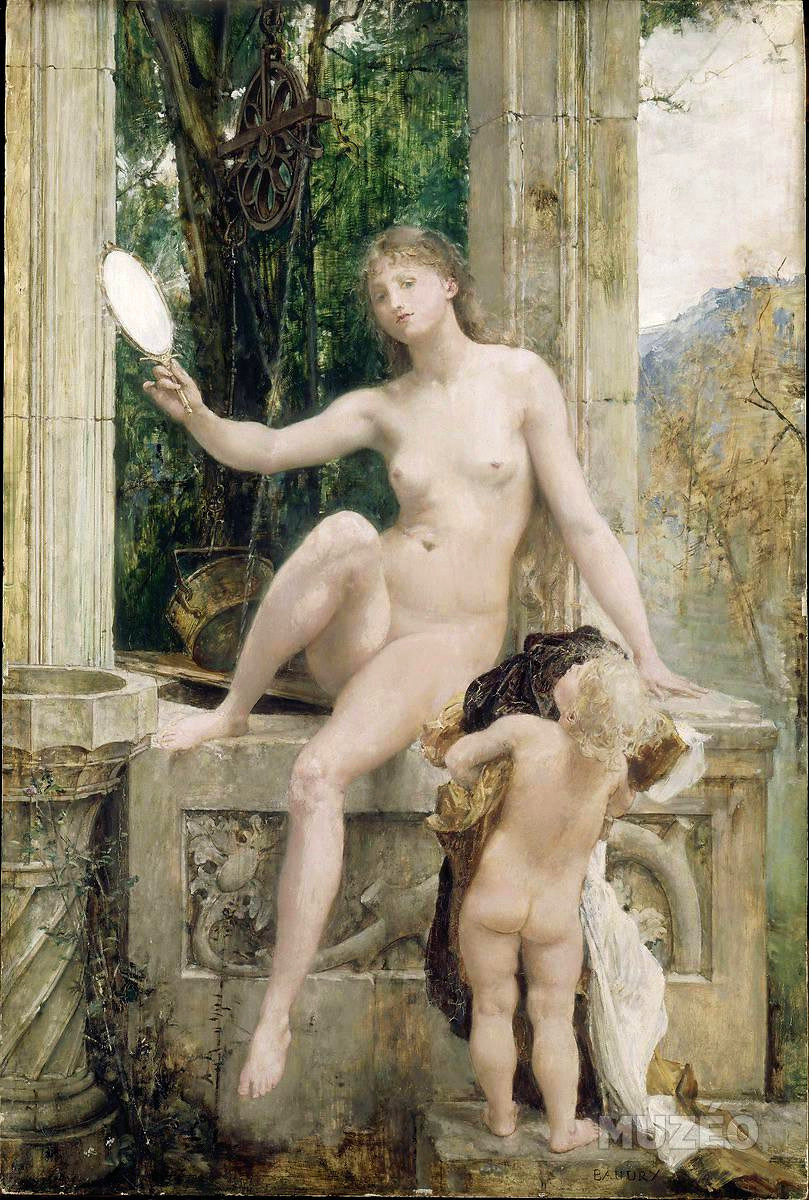
La vérité by Paul Baudry

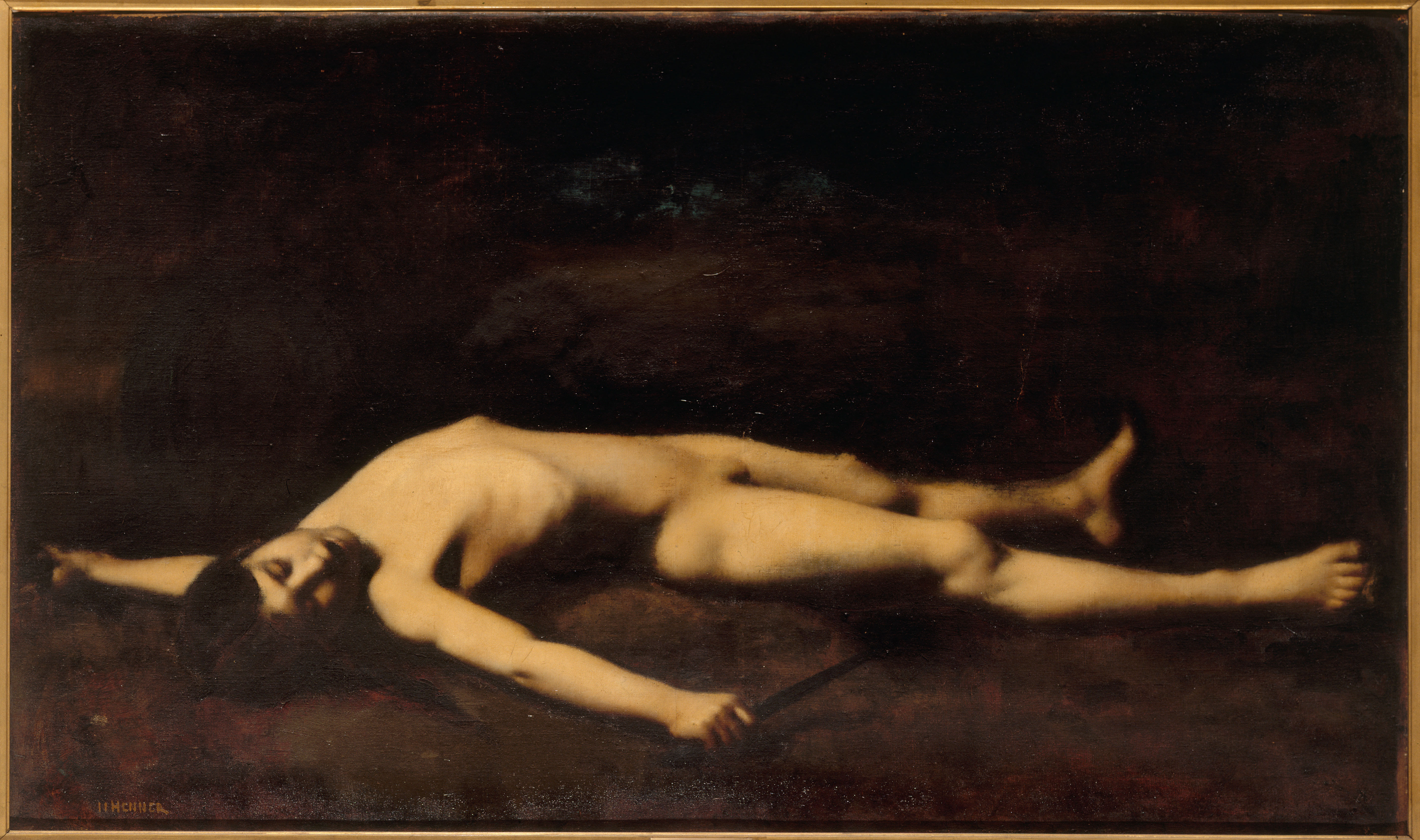
Bara by Jean-Jacques Henner

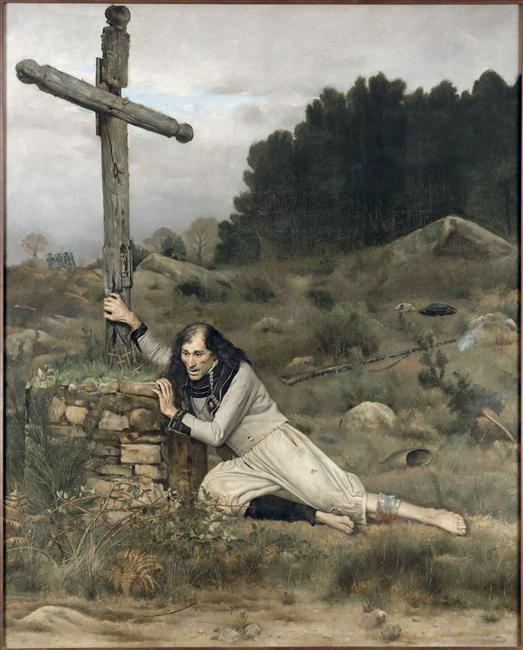
Scene from the Chouannerie by Auguste-Émile Belle

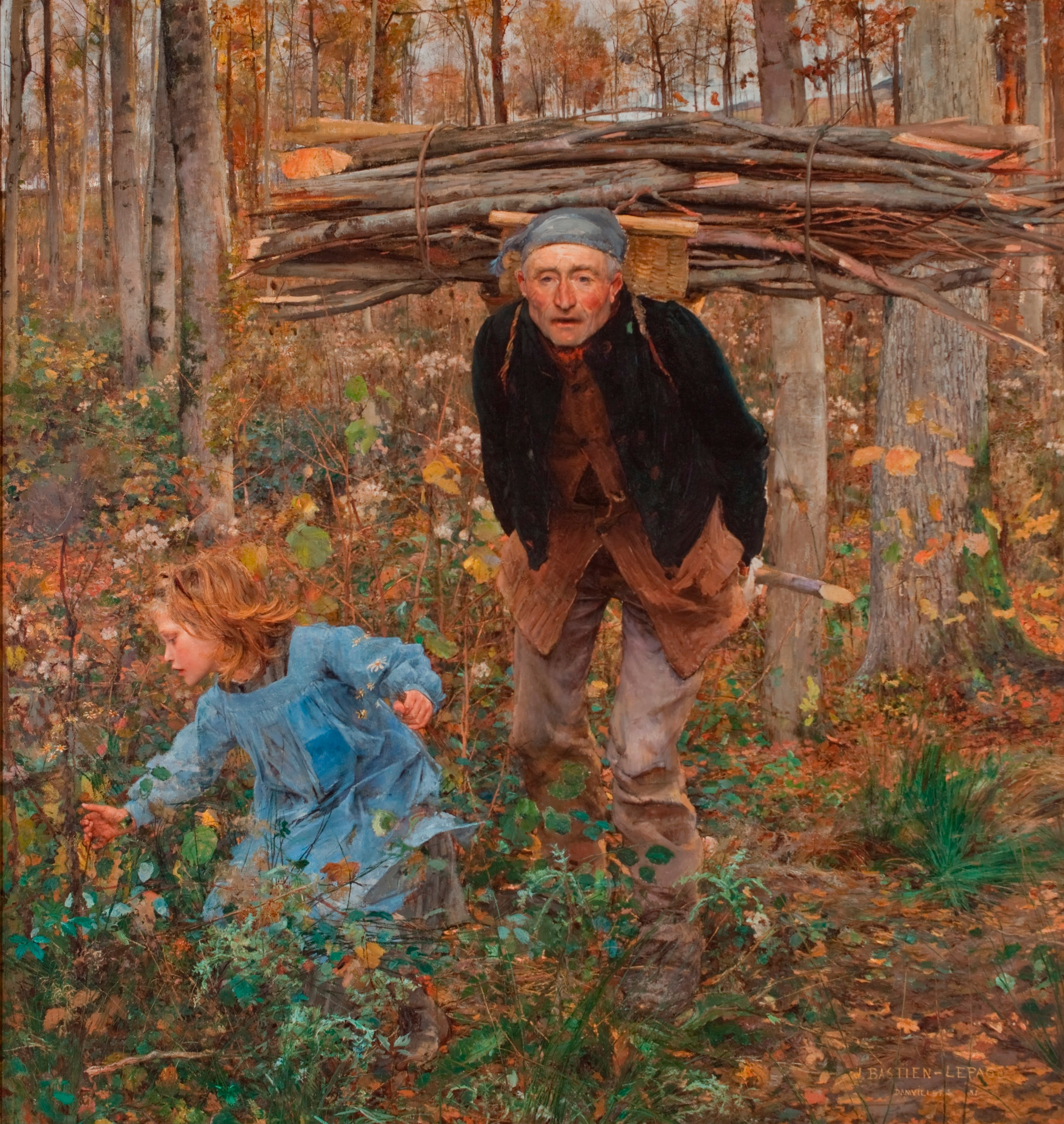
Le Père Jacques (The Wood Gatherer) by Jules Bastien-Lepage

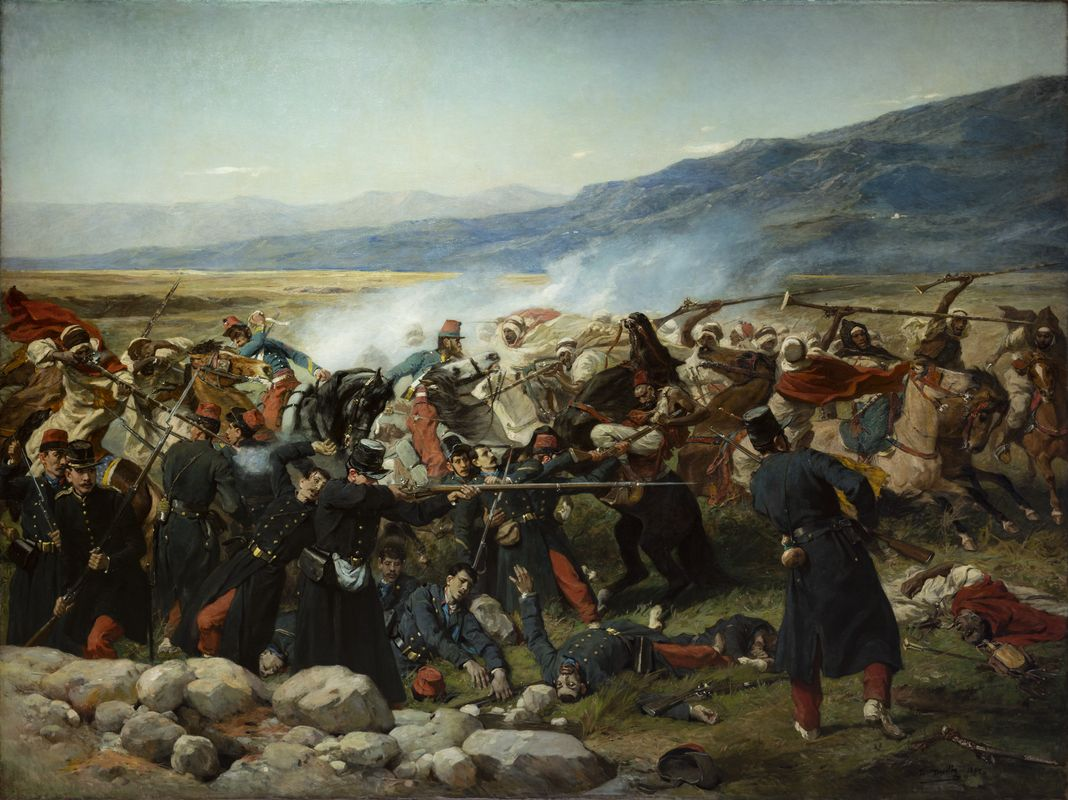
The Death of Sergeant Blandan by Louis-Théodore Devilly

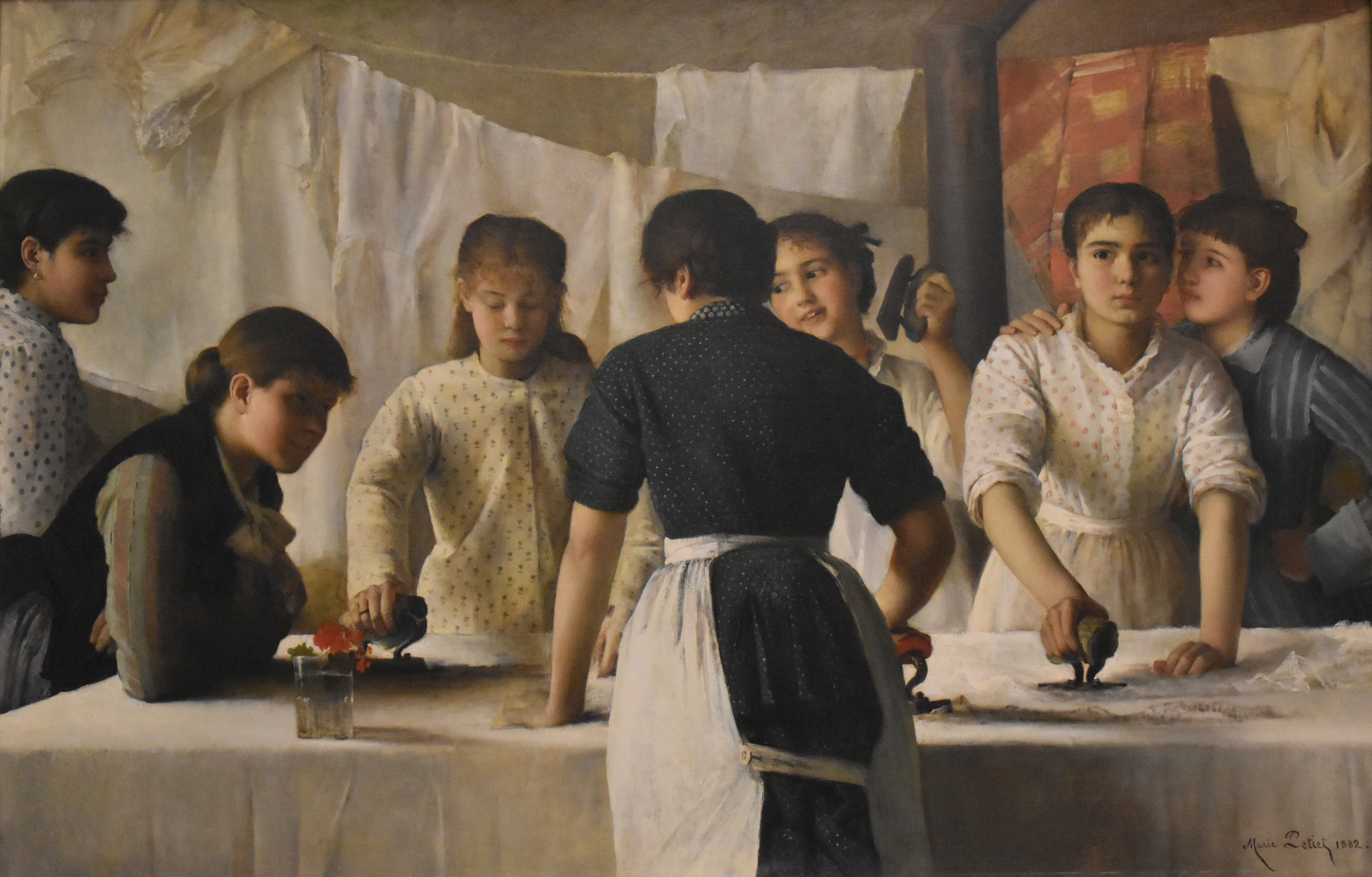
Blanchisseuses by Marie Petiet

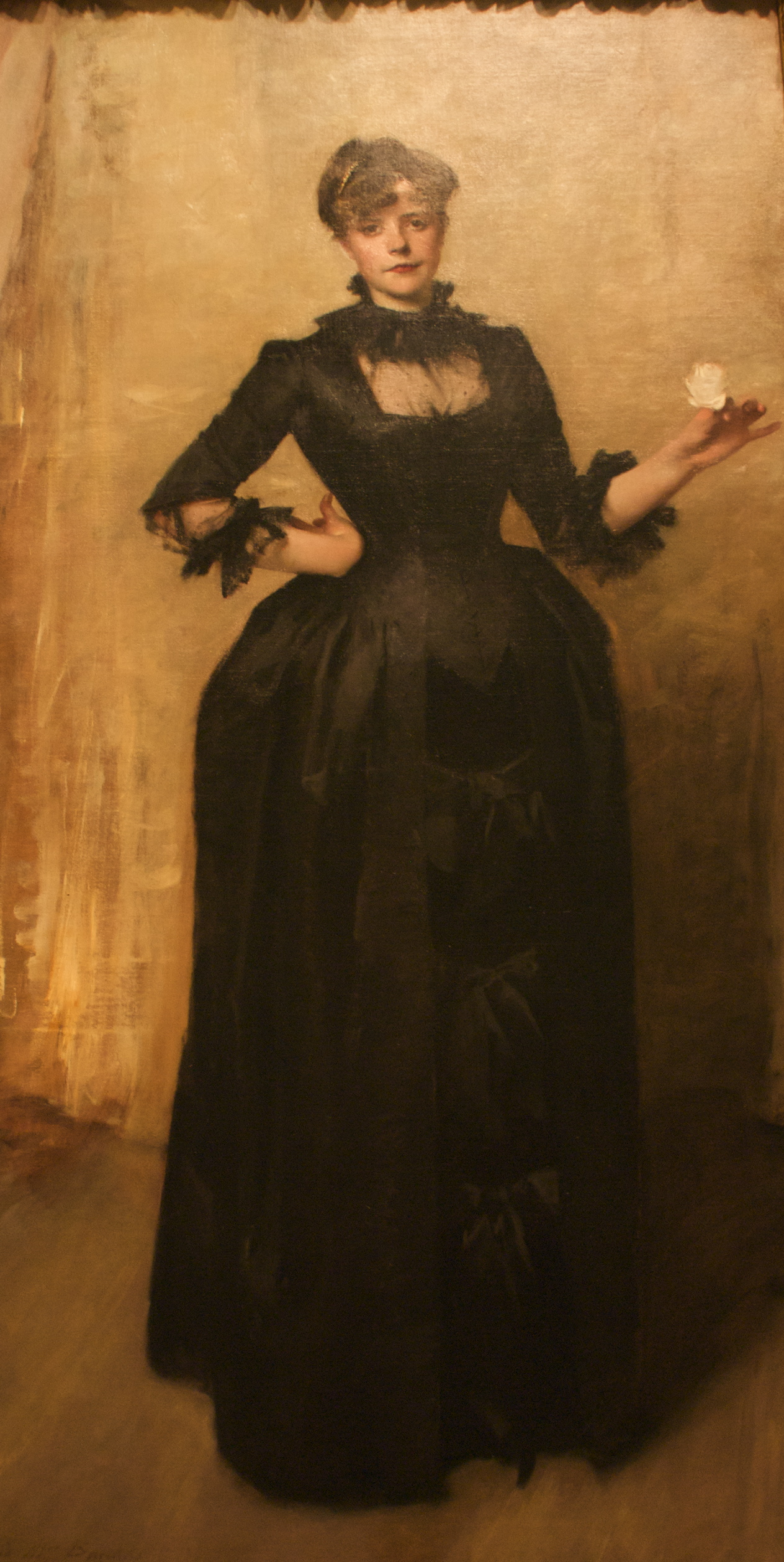
Lady with the Rose by John Singer Sargent

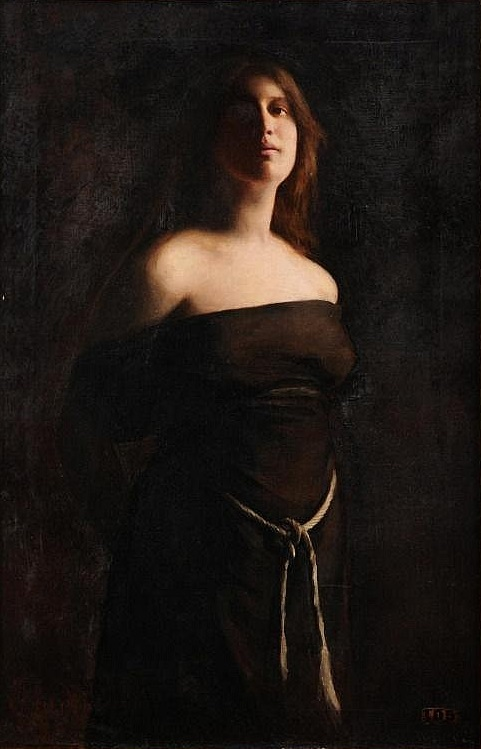
Captive by Mademoiselle Claudie

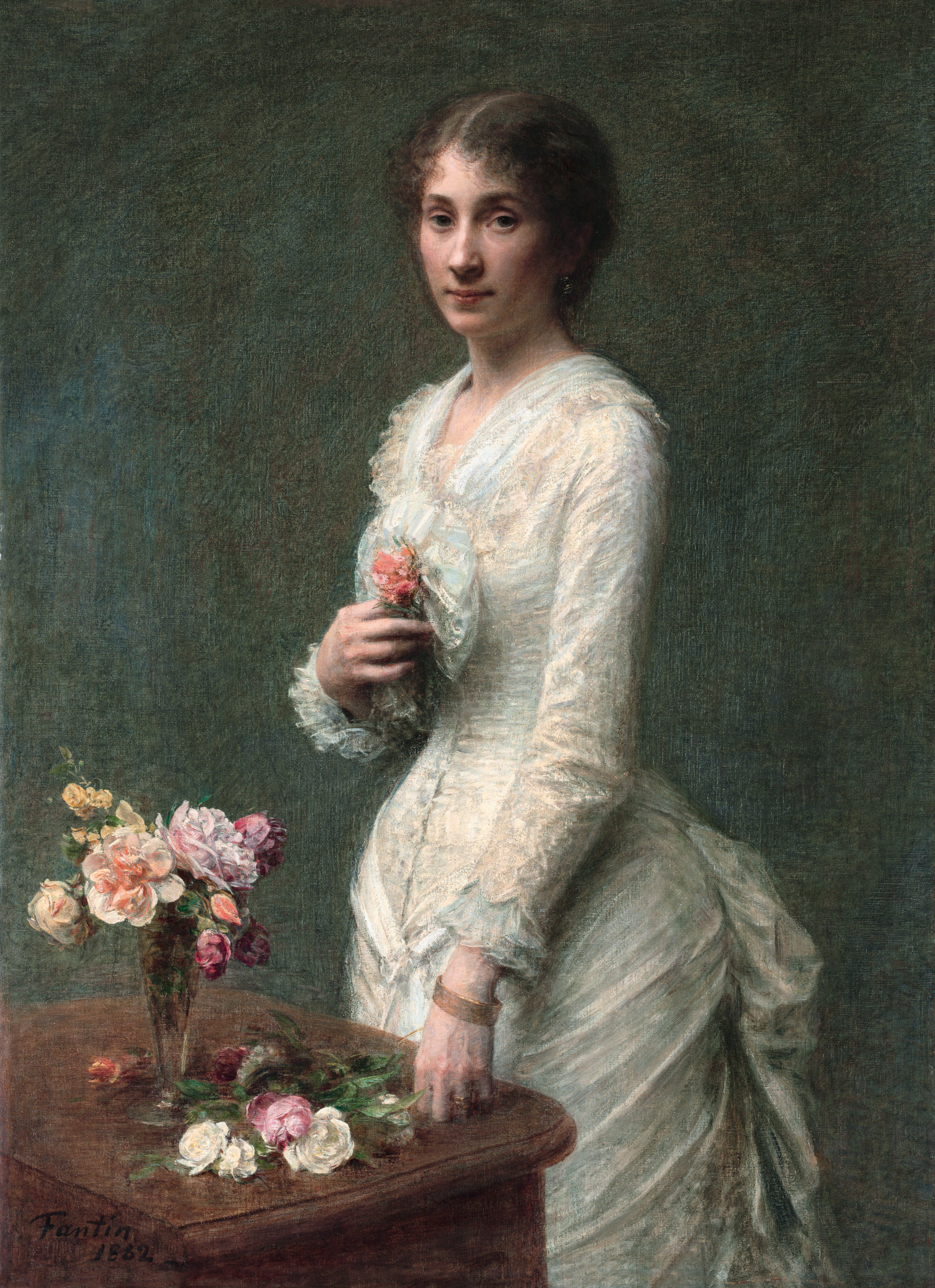
Portrait of Madame Lerolle by Henri Fantin-Latour

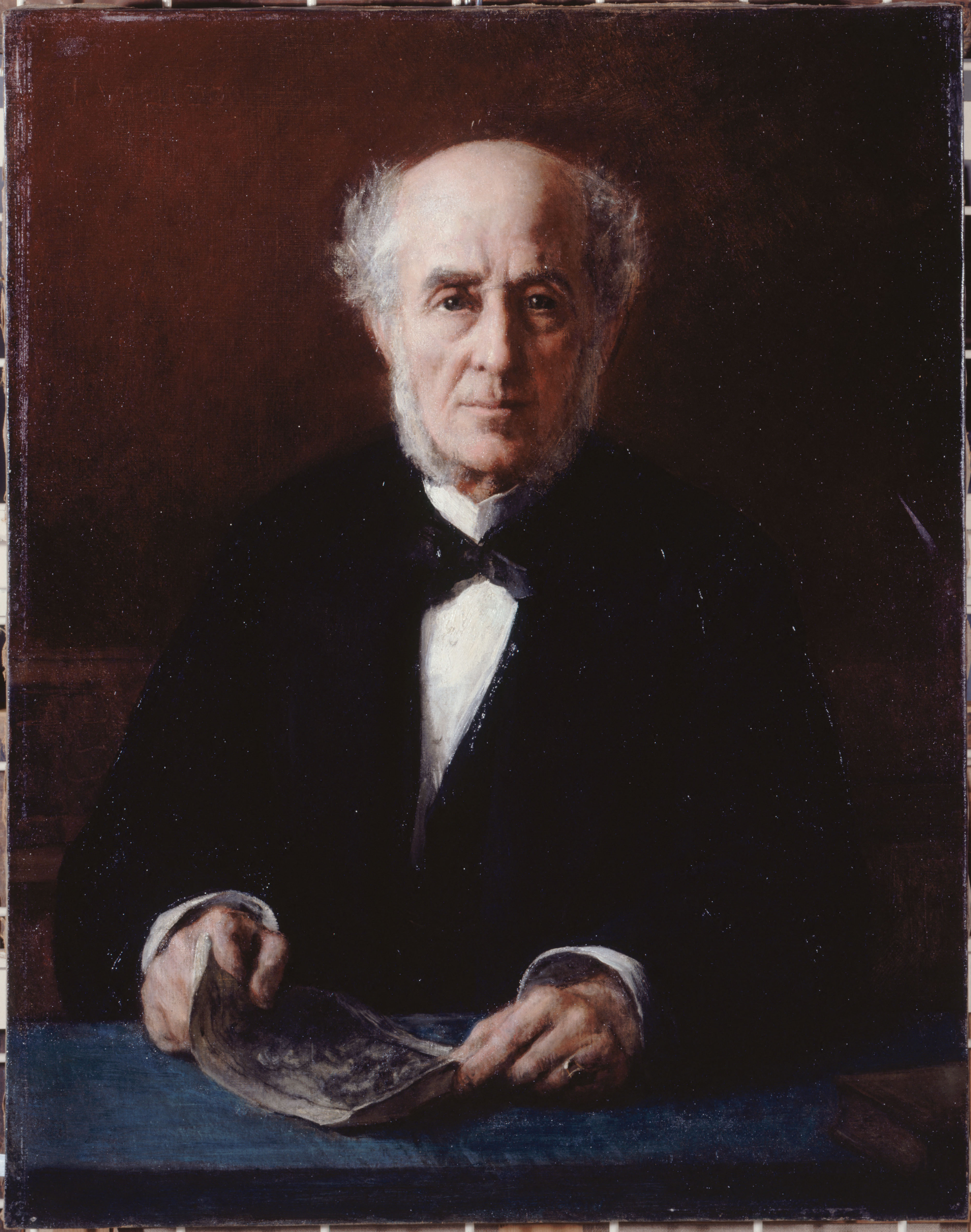
Portrait of Étienne Arago by Jules Emmanuel Valadon

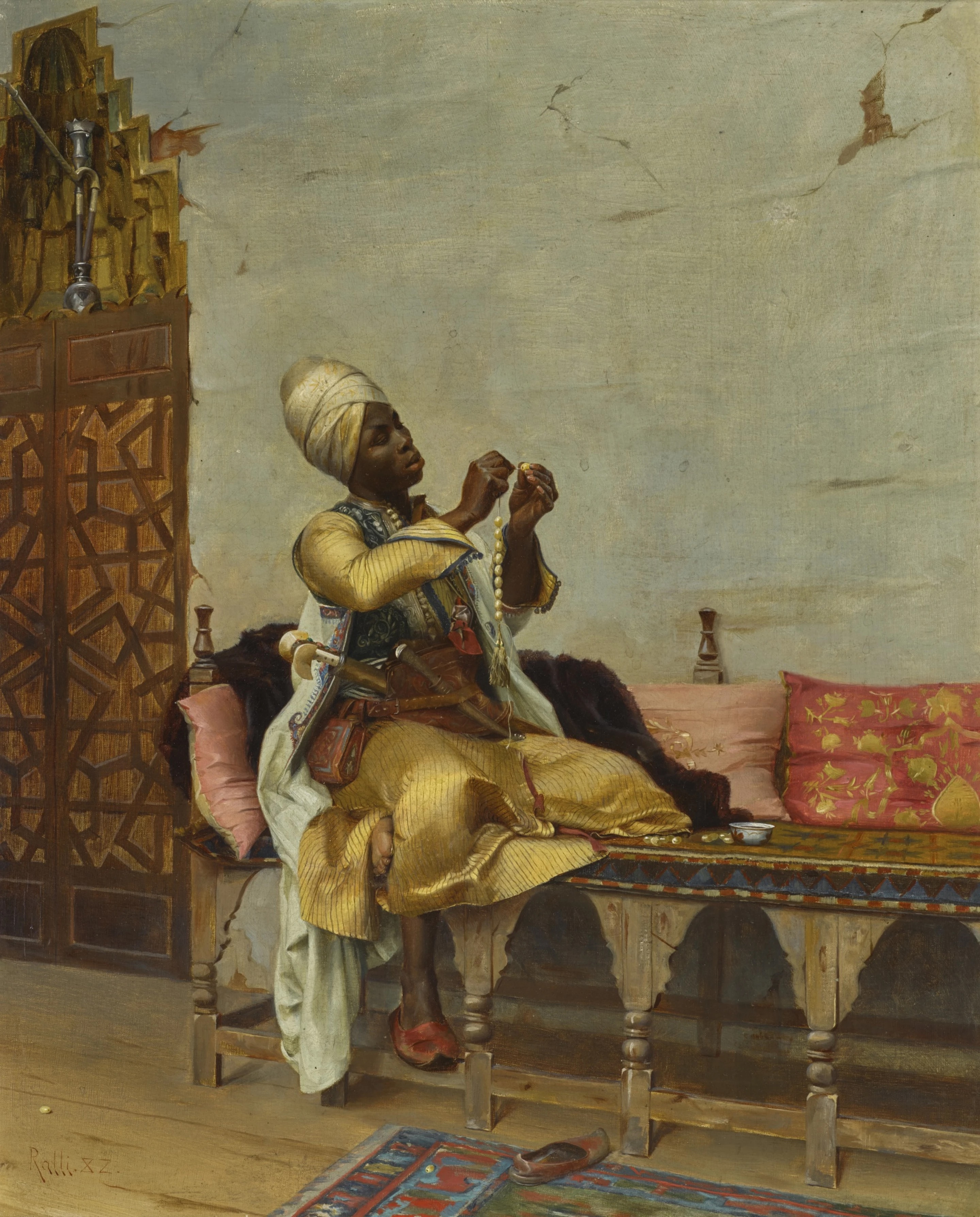
An Egyptian Eunuque by Théodore Ralli

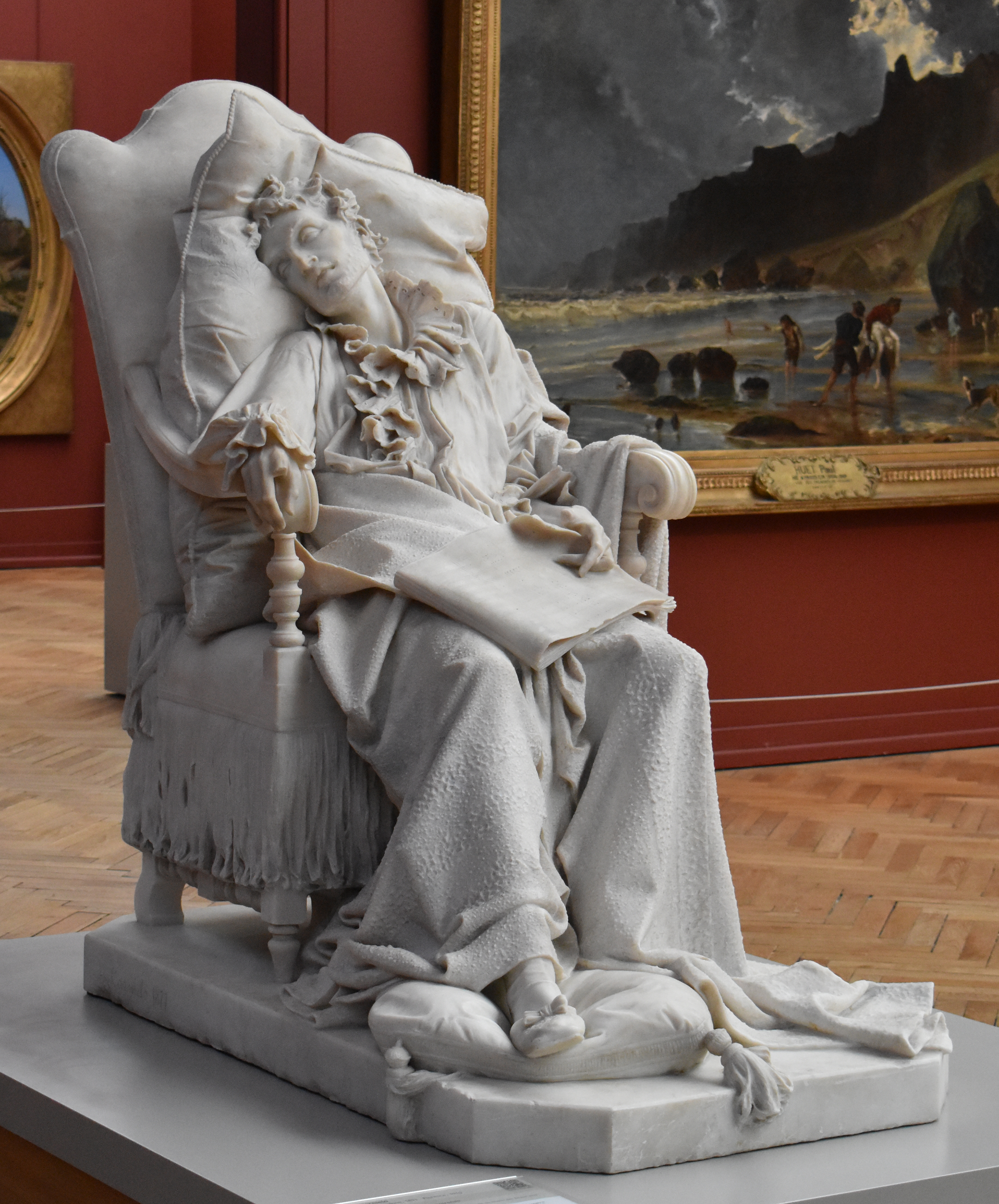
Mozart Expiring by Rinaldo Carnielo

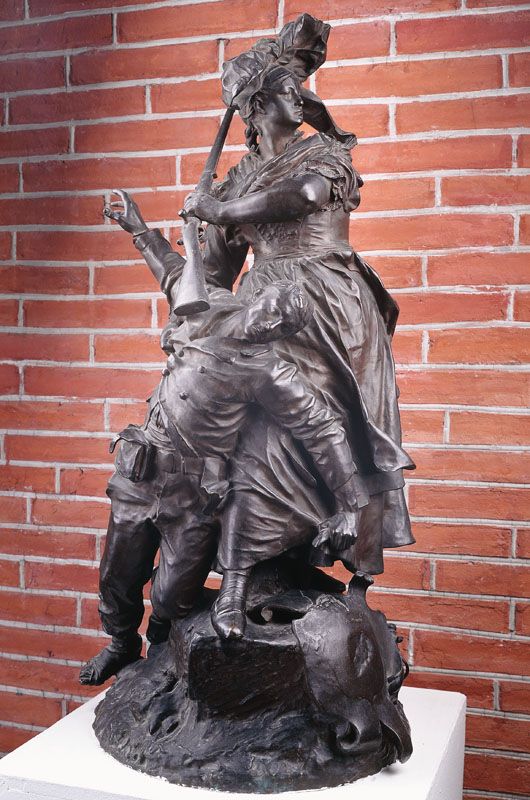
Quand même by Antonin Mercié

== See also ==
- Royal Academy Exhibition of 1882, held at Burlington House in London

== Bibliography ==
- Allard, Sébastien, Loyrette, Henri & Des Cars, Laurence. Nineteenth Century French Art: From Romanticism to Impressionism, Post-Impressionism and Art Nouveau. Rizzoli International Publications, 2007.
- Beeny, Emily A. Groom, Gloria Lynn & Allan, Scott. Manet and Modern Beauty: The Artist's Last Years. J. Paul Getty Museum, 2019.
- Brauer, Fae. Rivals and Conspirators: The Paris Salons and the Modern Art Centre. Cambridge Scholars Publishing, 2014.
- Harris, Nathaniel & Forsythe, James. The Art of Manet. Gallery Books, 1989.
- Sutherland, Daniel E. Whistler: A Life for Art's Sake. Yale University Press, 2014.
