= The Artist's Father, Reading L'Événement (Cézanne) =

1866 painting by Paul Cézanne

The Artist's Father, Reading "L'Événement"
- Le Père du peintre, lisant L'Événement (French)
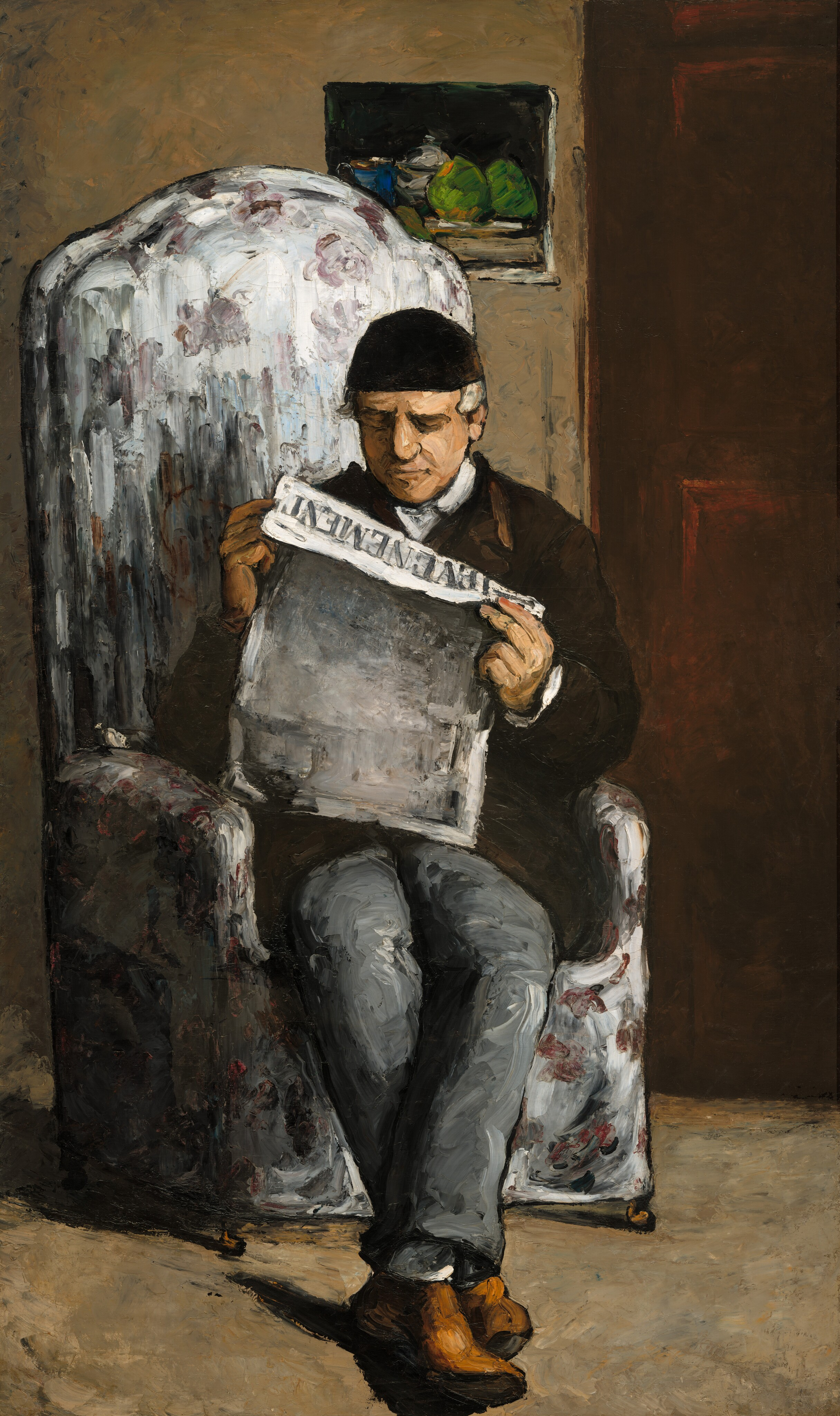
- Artist: Paul Cézanne
- Year: 1866
- Medium: Oil on canvas
- Dimensions: 198.5 cm × 119.3 cm (78.1 in × 47.0 in)
- Location: National Gallery of Art, Washington, D.C.

The Artist's Father, Reading "L'Événement" is an oil painting on canvas by French artist Paul Cézanne, from 1866. The work depicts Cézanne's father, Louis-Auguste Cézanne, seated in an armchair while reading the French newspaper L'Événement. The painting measures 198.5 × 119.3 cm and is held in the collection of the National Gallery of Art in Washington, D.C. It was displayed at the Salon of 1882.

== Provenance ==
The painting later belonged to several private collections, including those associated with art dealer Ambroise Vollard and collector Auguste Pellerin. It entered the National Gallery of Art in 1970, acquired with funds provided by Paul Mellon.

== See also ==
- List of paintings by Paul Cézanne
