= Lady with the Rose (Charlotte Louise Burckhardt) =

Painting by John Singer Sargent

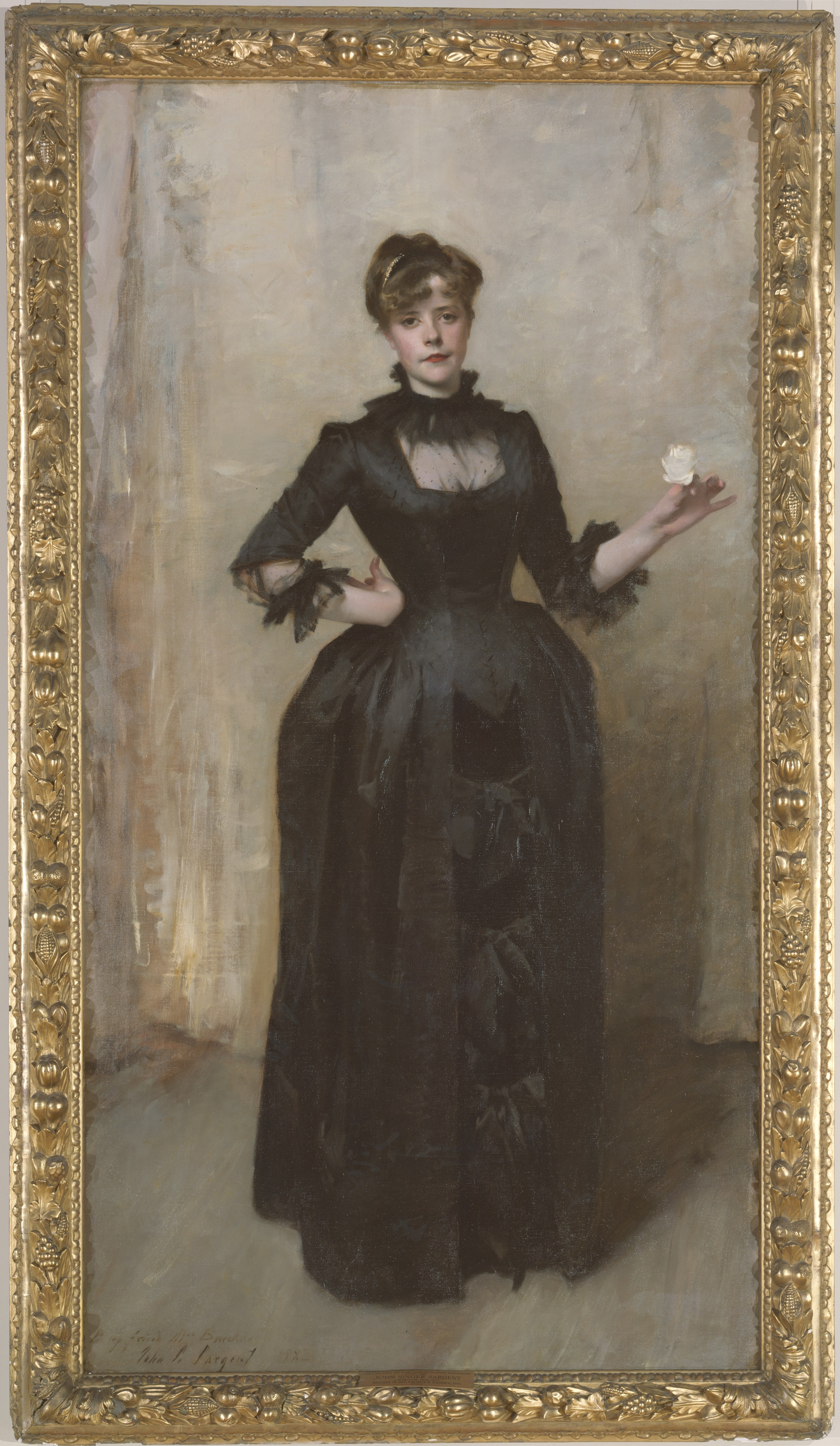
- Artist: John Singer Sargent
- Year: 1882
- Medium: oil on canvas
- Dimensions: 213.4 cm × 113.7 cm (84.0 in × 44.8 in)
- Location: Metropolitan Museum of Art, New York

Lady with the Rose (Charlotte Louise Burckhardt) is an 1882 painting by John Singer Sargent. It is part of the collection of the Metropolitan Museum of Art in New York City.

The subject of the painting, (Charlotte) Louise Burckhardt (1862—1892), was the twenty-year-old daughter of a Swiss merchant from Basel, members of the artist's cosmopolitan circle in Paris. She was the first wife of the fruit importer ("Banana King") Roger Ackerley, father of the writer J. R. Ackerley; she died after two years of marriage. The monochromatic tones and emphasis on the figure's silhouette are reminiscent of the style of the Spanish painter Diego Velázquez, whose work Sargent had been encouraged to study by his Parisian teacher Carolus-Duran. It was exhibited to great acclaim at the Paris Salon of 1882.

The work is on view at the Metropolitan Museum, Gallery 771.

== See also ==
- List of works by John Singer Sargent
