= Galleria Rinaldo Carnielo =

Coordinates: 43.7813°N 11.2665°E

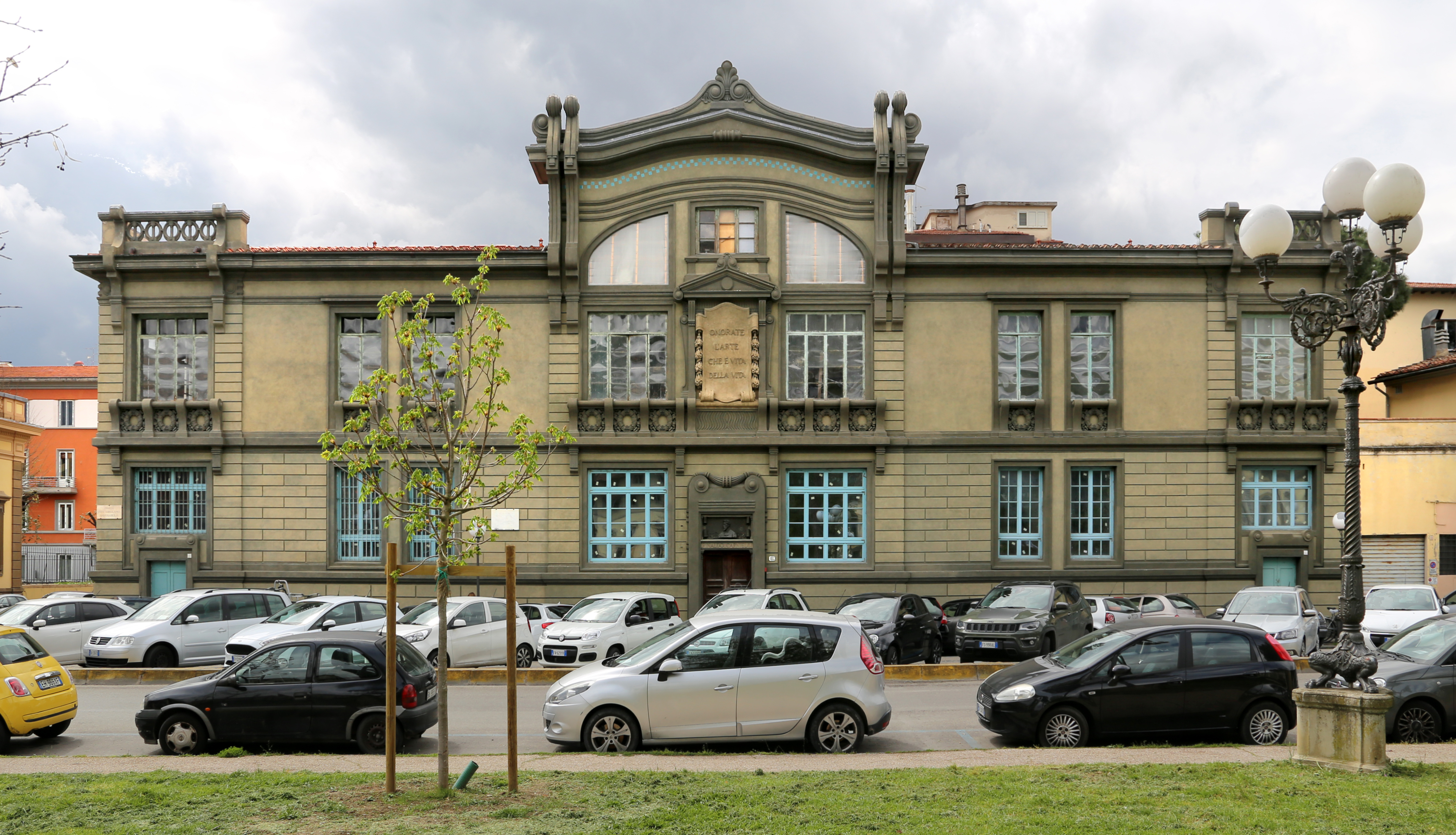
Facade of Gallery undergoing restoration in 2006.

The Galleria Rinaldo Carnielo is a museum encompassing the small palace and studio of the artist Rinaldo Carnielo (1853-1910), located on Piazza Savonarola #3, Florence, region of Tuscany. Italy.

The eclectic collection consists of nearly 300 works or models, mainly sculptures, by Carnielo, as well as some paintings by Carniello, and some of his colleagues Silvestro Lega, Michele Gordigiani, and Arturo Calosci. Among the works of Carnielo are some macabre sculptures such as Tenax Vitae, Dying Mozart, and Angel of Death.

The small palace is built in the Italian counterpart of Art Nouveau, known as Stile Liberty, and was donated to the commune in 1957 by the sculptor's son. In October 2015, the museum was temporarily closed.

The design and construction of the palace dates to the 1880s and appears to have involved Rinaldo Carnielo and Enrico Lusini. The facade has various inscriptions including a bust of the artist with the inscription "Non ominis moriar". A scroll in the center facade states "Onorate l'arte che è vita della vita" (Honor art which is the life of life).
