= Rinaldo Carnielo =

Italian sculptor (1853–1910)

Rinaldo Carnielo (1853–1910) was an Italian sculptor known for his macabre sensibility.

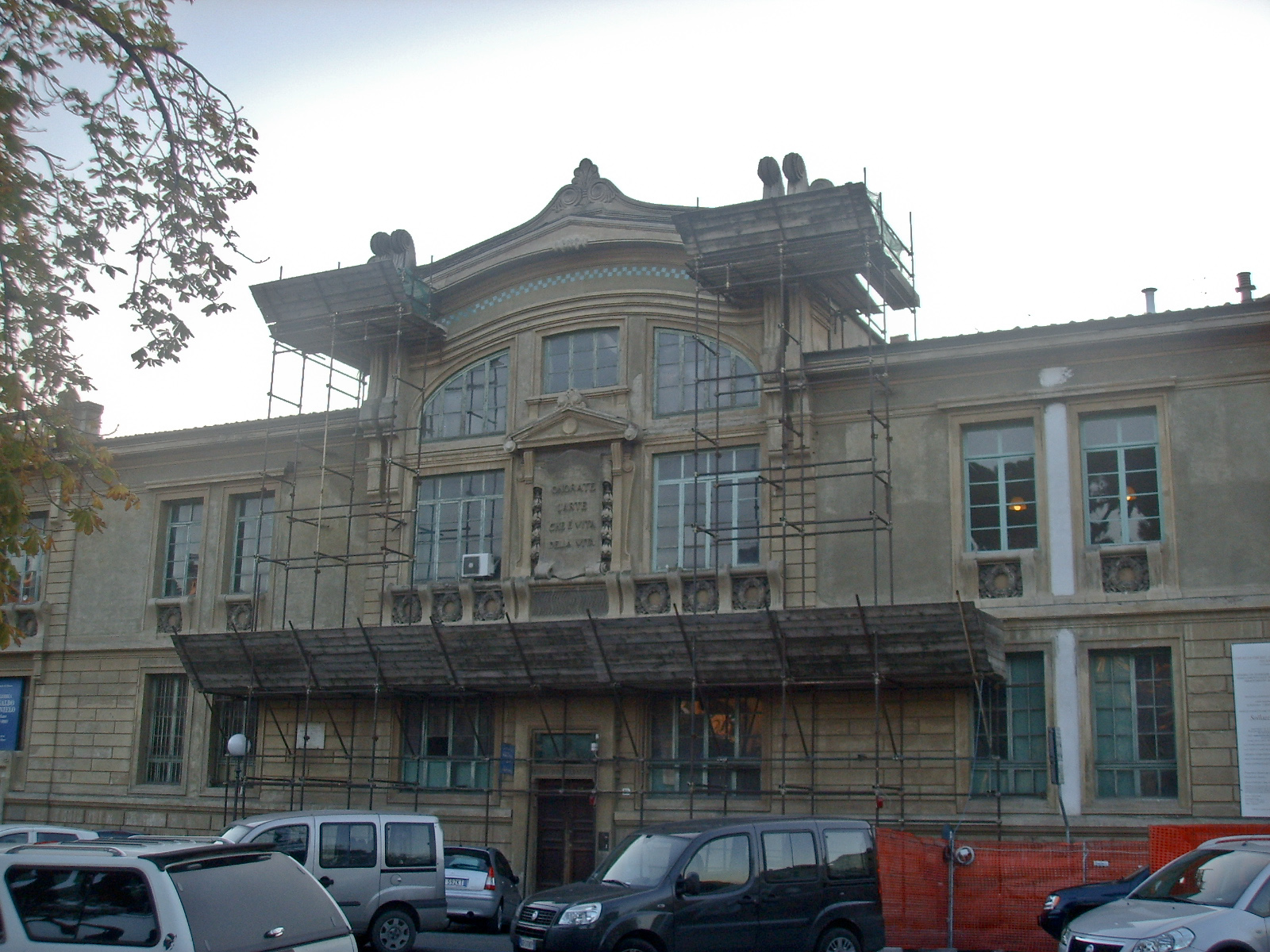
Facade of Galleria Carnielo in Florence, under restoration

== Biography ==
He was born in Biadene, in the Province of Treviso, Italy, to a family of modest means. He briefly enrolled in Padua in a technical institute but abandoned this for the institute of design started by Pietro Selvatico. From there, he moved to study sculpture for a year at the Academy of Fine Arts in Florence under Aristodemo Costoli and then served a further year of study. He opened a studio, but, deprived of many commissions, he was indigent.

Encouraged by the older Giovanni Duprè, he obtained a studio at the academy and there composed his Dying Mozart. The statue was sent to a Paris Exposition of 1878, where it was generally well received. Local critiques were less fond, including Duprè, who labeled it a "puny beast", and Augusto Rivalta, who described it as "someone dead two months who is falling apart".

This deprecation was not universal, and a commission granting prizes from the Italian government, including Domenico Morelli, Roberto Bompiani, Emilio De Fabris, and Odoardo Tabacchi, found high merit to the work. The contrarian Morelli specially praised the work.

This success led to many private commissions and financial success. Among his major works are Tenax Vitae, a struggle between skeletal death and a young man, and A capuchin imploring death as a boon from God (Dio non posso pregare). Some works have organic chimeric figures. He continued to make large and small works in bronze. He became Professore corrispondente dell'Accademia di Belle Arti in Florence and died in that city.

== Legacy ==
He was and remains enigmatic to many, and assessments of Carnielo are still evolving. He was bewildering to his contemporaries.

In 1893, Helen Zimmern, met the sculptor, and quoted a critic describing Rinaldo as a man where: talent and character are so essentially opposed to one another, so fundamentally antagonistic, that his personality offers the attraction of a most interesting physiological and psychological problem. She noted the apparent want of cohesion between the man and the artist: his art, strange and bizarre, often focused on death; while Rinaldo himself was a healthy and mild-mannered family man, although not light-hearted and with a grim seriousness about his art. Some derided Carnielo as a misanthrope, but she perceived a more complex artist, who does not understand mankind that laughs and is merry... For him, the shadow of death pervades all existence. She also noted his dedication to art, as one who cares not one jot whether his statues find purchasers, so long as he himself is satisfied with the results.

James Jackson Jarves, over a decade earlier, in a review of Dying Mozart had been less sympathetic:

Carnielo's work is faithful; for he closely watched its phenomena in the hospitals here from dying men. The expression is not painful, nor is it ecstatic, as if the spirit, recognizing its coming joy, imprinted in the still pliable form some of its own peace passing understanding. The artist has just missed the spiritual element by too earnest study of the material phenomena. These, with the well-wrought accessories, so overpower it as at first glance to embarrass the spectator in rightfully apprehending the vital motive... (the) statue exhibits too much the material outlook of an expiring mortal, as an anatomical study, and does not sufficiently bring to view or suggest those more subtle distinctions which make the vast difference between Mozart and common men, irradiating his mortal frame with specific genius and filling all men's minds with undying sentiments of love and admiration.

Jarves goes on to criticize that

the art-creed of men of Carnielo's stamp... (disbelieve) alike in the classical theory of the beautiful and the spiritual idealism of the mediaevalists, they plant their art on solid realism and uncompromising eye-fact...Art is always greatest and loveliest when most creative and suggestive and least in bondage to literal, material fact, or nature in the limbo of physical science. Consistent to his view of art, Carnielo has modelled a series of sepulchral monuments in the form of sarcophagi, with figures of men or women lying on them dead, or bending over them in profoundest grief. Their tableaux-pose is admirable modelling and thoroughly life-like, but the costumes are the fashionable attire of the hour, carefully executed to the minutest details...It is a serious misfortune that the best talent of the day should seriously put forth such work as genuine art, but it is the natural result of believing in picturesque sculpture.

Others had mixed opinions, noting that Carnielo is a man of original ideas and individuality of expression, and, while he has none of the Titanic power of Rodin, he resembles him at least in the independence of character which has enabled him to cut away from conventions and traditions, and in the boldness of hand which in their modified degree his works display.

The Art Nouveau house and studio of the artist, located in Piazza Savonarola, just outside the Viali di Circonvallazione in Florence, Italy, was donated by his son to the City, and is being renovated into a museum, the Galleria Rinaldo Carnielo.

== See also ==
- Courtauld Gallery, photograph of Tenax Vitae, Dying Mozart, and other works.
