= Emily Sargent =

American watercolor artist (1857–1936)

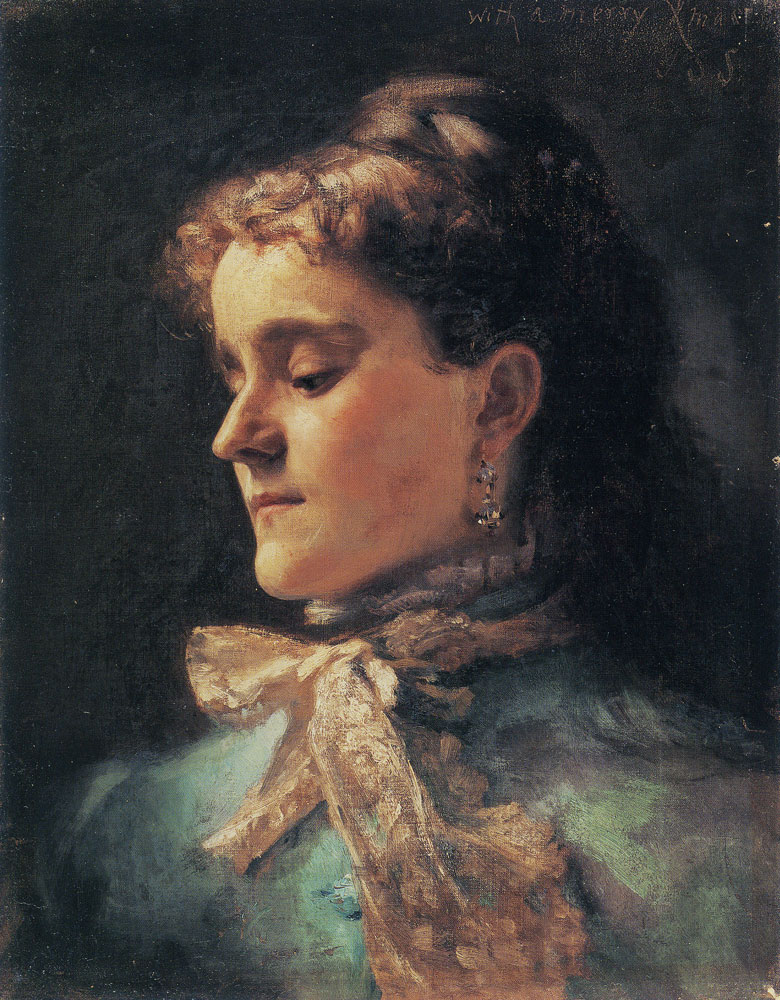
- John Singer Sargent portrait of Emily (c. 1877)
- Born: Emily Sargent; 22 January 1857; Rome, Italy
- Died: 1936
- Known for: Watercolor

Emily Sargent (1857-1936) is best known as a watercolor artist and as the sister of the painter John Singer Sargent. Emily Sargent painted alongside her brother throughout her life. Her work has been little known until recently as she exhibited her work only once in her lifetime, but her family donated examples to many museums leading to increasing recognition.

== Early life ==
Emily Sargent’s father, FitzWilliam (b. 1820 in Gloucester, Massachusetts), was an eye surgeon at the Wills Eye Hospital in Philadelphia from 1844 to 1854. Her mother, Mary Newbold Sargent (née Singer, 1826–1906), suffered a breakdown after the death of her first child, and the couple decided to go abroad to recover. They were nomadic expatriates for the rest of their lives. Sargent's parents were based in Paris, but moved regularly, spending time at the sea and at mountain resorts in France, Germany, Italy, and Switzerland. On January 22, 1857, Emily was born in Rome. After Emily’s birth, FitzWilliam resigned his post in Philadelphia and accepted his wife's request to remain abroad. They lived on a small inheritance and savings, leading a quiet life with their children. They generally avoided society and other Americans, except for friends in the art world. Three more children were born abroad, only two of whom lived past childhood.

When Emily was four years old, she injured her spine. This resulted in her recovering for many years, often leaving her disabled for periods of time. She dealt with the repercussions of the injury for the rest of her life.

Mary Sargent was an artist and wanted her children to be well-versed in art and participate in the art world. While Emily's brother John became a well-known oil painter, Emily focused on watercolor painting, which was considered more suitable for a young woman.

Emily's injury did not stop her from traveling widely throughout her life, first with her parents and later with her brother John.

== Art and travels ==
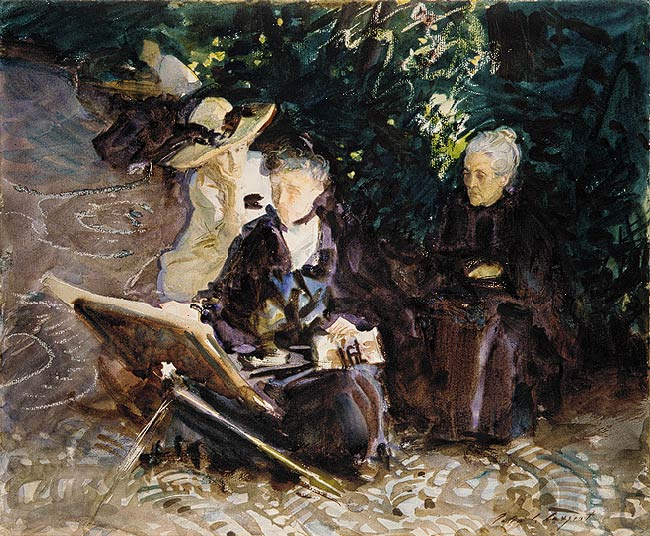
Sargent at her easel, as painted by her brother John (1912)

Emily and John were close and both lived in Europe most of their lives, often traveling and painting together. Places that they traveled to included Rome, Spain, England, and the United States. Neither married or had children, and Emily sometimes served as a hostess for her brother and helped him with his clients. During her travels, Emily would frequently send letters to her friends about her journeys. Not only did Emily Sargent travel with her brother, she also painted alongside him. Some of her watercolors include Sea and Shore, Nile, Dead Sea, and Rocky Landscape.

== Legacy ==
Sargent exhibited a few copies after Old Master paintings at the Whitechapel Gallery in 1908, but otherwise her worked remained with the family. In 1998, 440 of her watercolors were discovered in a trunk in a family residence. Many of these works have been given to some of the world's best known museums, including the Museum of Fine Arts, Boston (45 watercolors), the Tate (29), the National Gallery of Art(25), the Metropolitan Museum of Art (22), the Brooklyn Museum (20), the Ashmolean Museum(19), as well as the Sargent House Museum(15) in Gloucester, Massachusetts, where several of her ancestors lived.

The first major exhibition of her work Emily Sargent, A Glimpse into her World was held at the Cape Ann Museum in Gloucester in 2022.

From July 1, 2025–March 8, 2026, the Metropolitan Museum exhibited “Emily Sargent: Portrait of a Family” which focused on her watercolors, as well as those of her brother and mother.

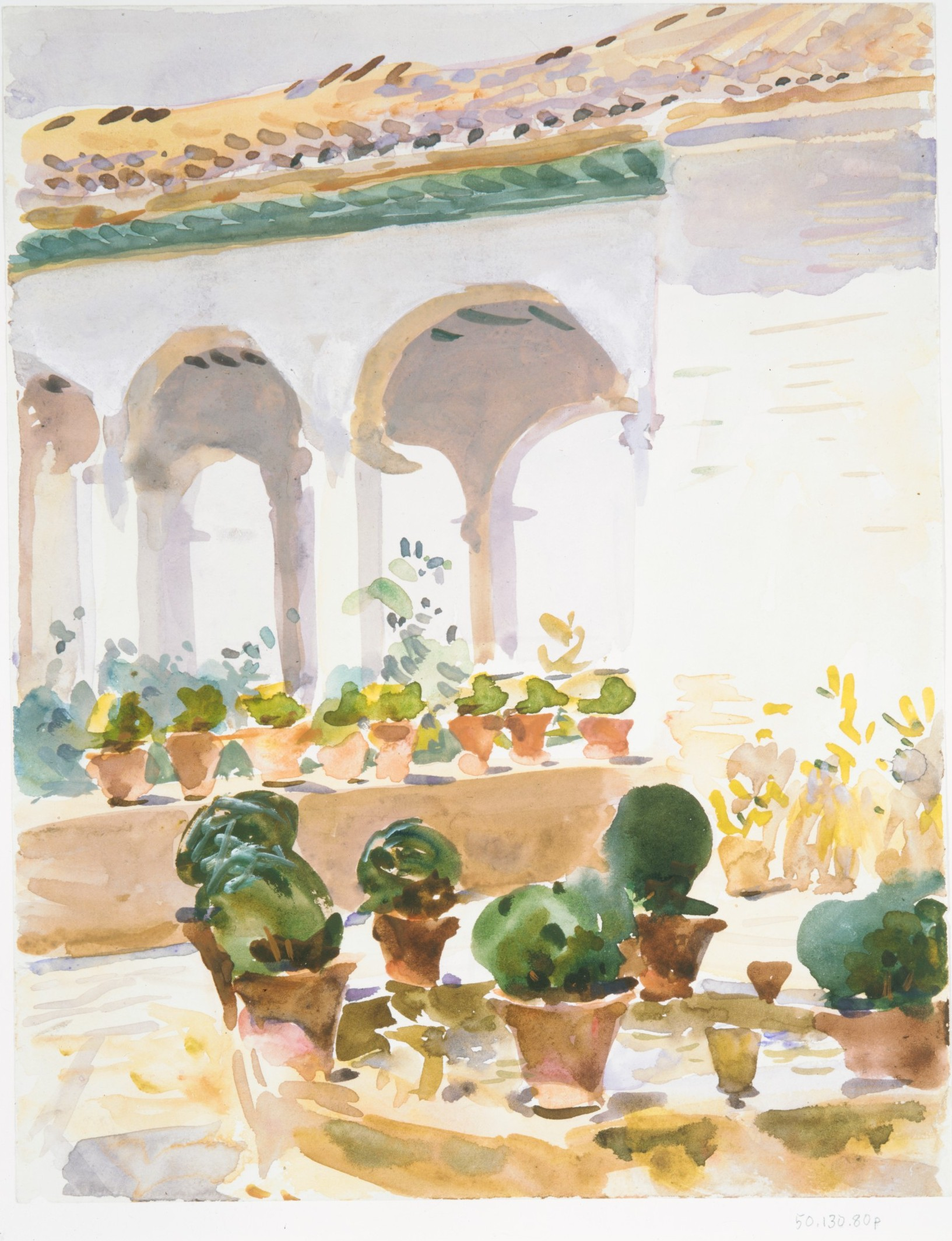
Spain

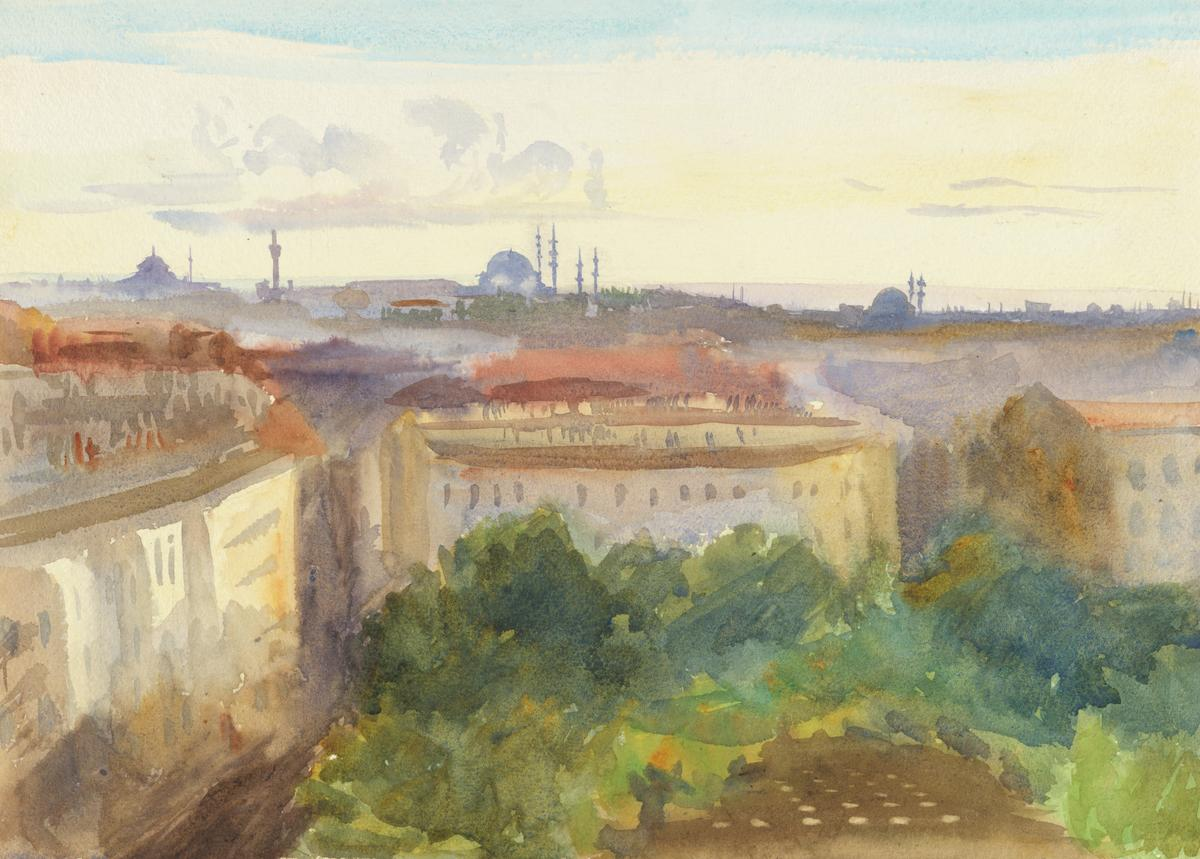
View of Constantinople (1904)

== Work cited ==
- Olson, Stanley (1986). John Singer Sargent: His Portrait. New York: St. Martin's Press. ISBN 0-312-44456-7.
