= Mountain Stream (John Singer Sargent) =

Drawing by John Singer Sargent

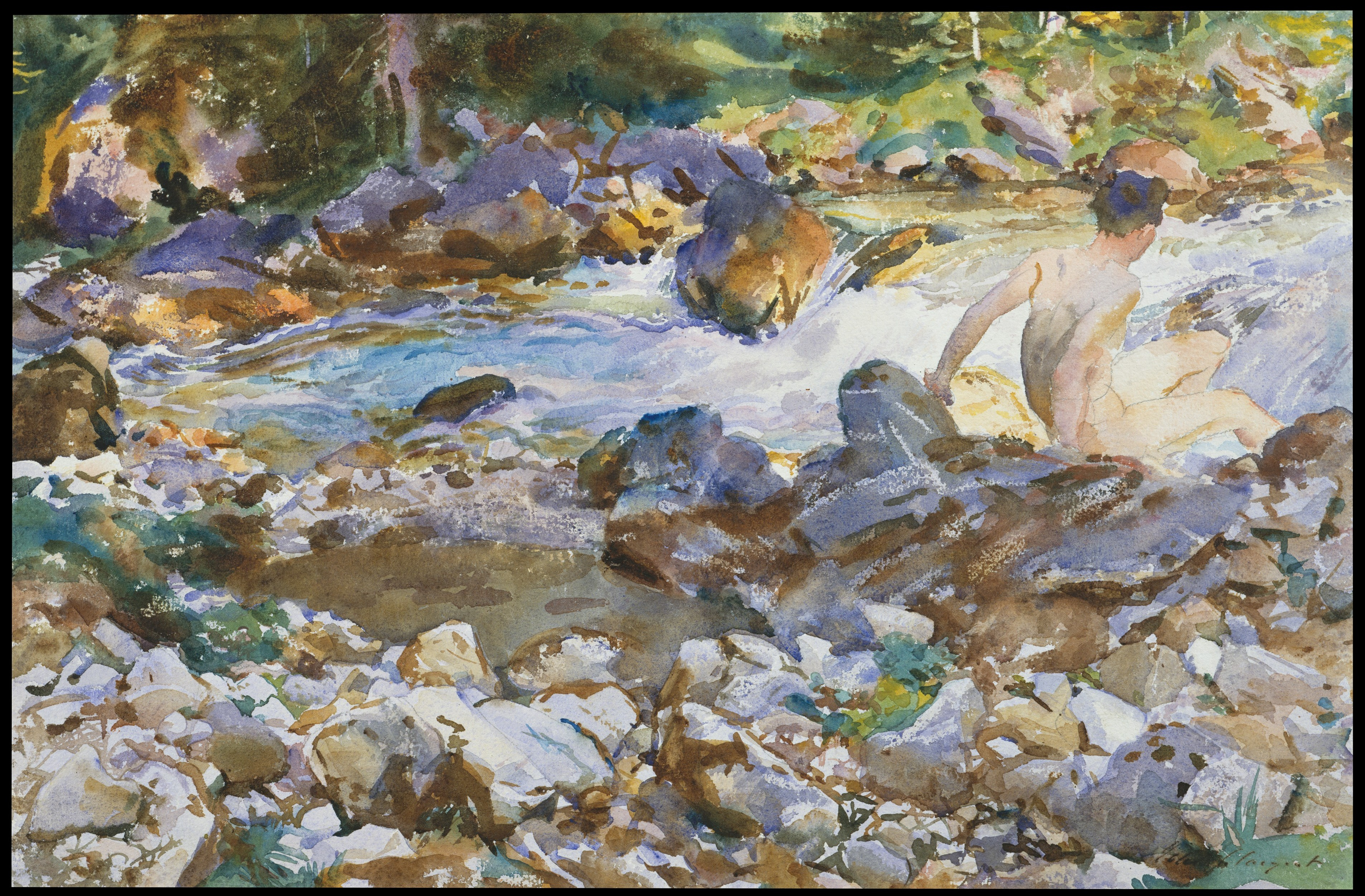
- Artist: John Singer Sargent
- Year: c. 1912–1914
- Medium: Watercolor and graphite on paper
- Dimensions: 34.8 cm × 53.3 cm (13.7 in × 21.0 in)
- Location: Metropolitan Museum of Art; New York

Mountain Stream is an early 20th century watercolor drawing by the American artist John Singer Sargent. Done in watercolor and graphite pencil on wove paper, the work depicts a nude figure by a dazzling mountain stream. Sargent's work was donated to the Metropolitan Museum of Art, where it remains, as part of the bequest of Joseph Pulitzer in 1915.

== See also ==
- List of works by John Singer Sargent
