= Arab Woman (watercolor) =

Watercolor painting by John Singer Sargent

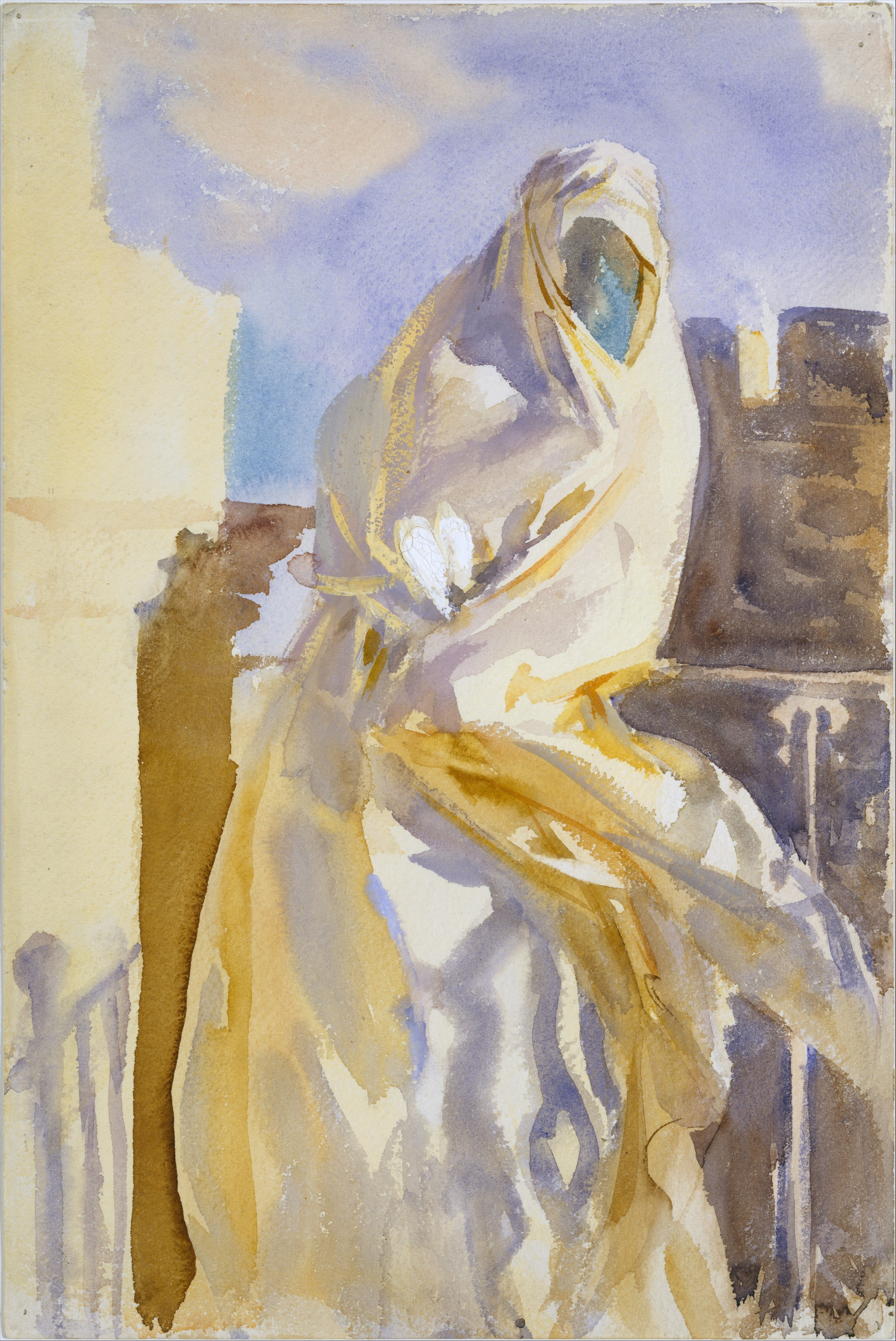
- Artist: John Singer Sargent
- Year: c. 1905–1906
- Medium: Watercolor on cloth
- Dimensions: 55.9 cm × 40.6 cm (22.0 in × 16.0 in)
- Location: Metropolitan Museum of Art; New York

Arab Woman is a watercolor painting by American artist John Singer Sargent, created c. 1905–1906. It is in the collection of the Metropolitan Museum of Art, in New York.

== History ==
John Singer Sargent traveled to Europe, Africa and Asia twice. The first trip was to Greece, Egypt, and Turkey in 1890, and the second to Syria and Palestine in 1905.

Arab Woman was produced by Sargent during one of his travels in West Asia. The image, done in watercolor and gouache on woven white paper, depicts a veiled Muslim woman wearing a white niqāb. According to an inscription left by Sargent on the painting, the work is incomplete.

== See also ==
- List of works by John Singer Sargent
