= The Misses Vickers =

Painting by John Singer Sargent

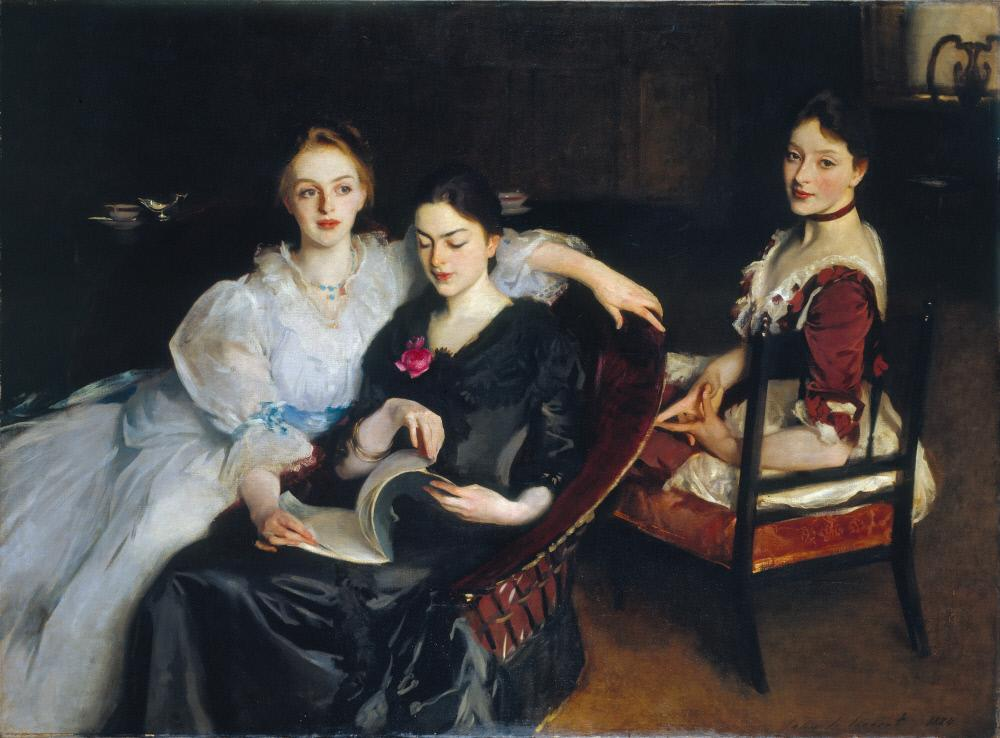
- Artist: John Singer Sargent
- Year: 1884
- Medium: Oil on canvas
- Dimensions: 166.6 cm × 212.2 cm (65.6 in × 83.5 in)
- Location: Weston Park Museum, Sheffield

The Misses Vickers is an oil painting by John Singer Sargent. The painting depicts three young ladies, from the Vickers family, in their estate in Bolsover Hill, Sheffield, England.

== Background ==
The Misses Vickers, painted in 1884 by John Singer Sargent, is a portrait of three sisters, Florence Evelyn Vickers, Mabel Frances Vickers, and Clara Mildred Vickers. The portrait was commissioned by their father, Colonel Thomas Vickers, a wealthy industrialist. Following its completion, The Misses Vickers was first exhibited at the Salon of 1885 alongside a portrait of Mrs. Albert Vickers, completed by Sargent in June 1884. Sargent later exhibited The Misses Vickers with Mrs. Albert Vickers and Portrait of Mrs. Robert Harrison at the Royal Academy in 1886. Despite Colonel Vickers being pleased with the portrait, art critics at the Salon of 1885 overlooked it. The general opinion was less than enthusiastic, but one anonymous critic from The Spectator felt that the portrait was "in its way probably the cleverest thing in the exhibition. It is the ne plus ultra of French painting, or rather, of the French method as learned by a foreigner."

== Inspiration ==
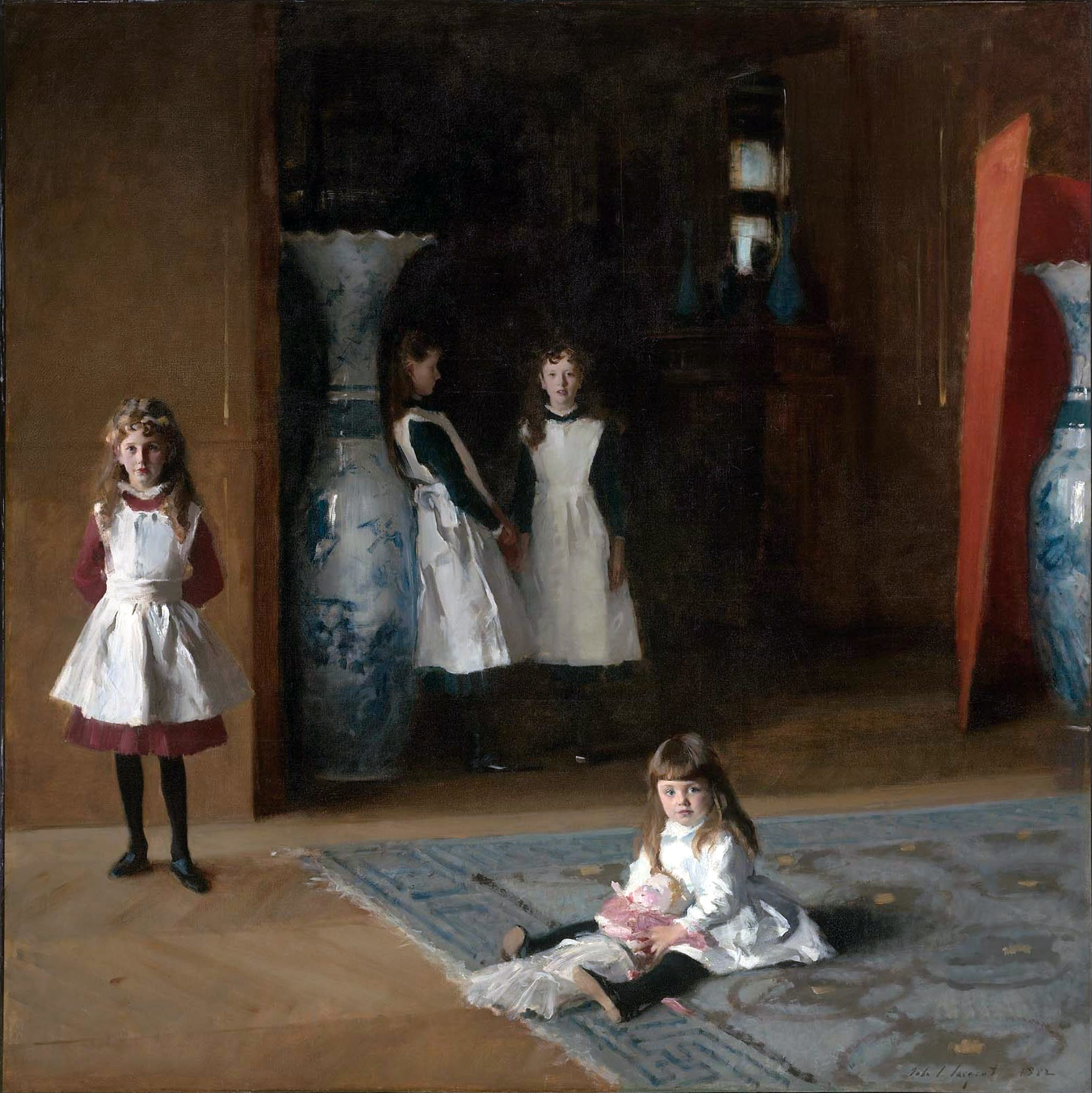
The Daughters of Edward Darley Boit (1882) by Sargent

Sargent was an admirer of the Pre-Raphaelite Brotherhood, an art movement founded by Dante Gabriel Rossetti in 1848. Rossetti's own portraits of women served as aesthetic inspiration to Sargent. It has been noted that grouping of the three sisters in The Misses Vickers is very similar to The Daughters of Edward Darley Boit, a portrait painted by Sargent in 1882. There are also formal similarities to Hearts Are Trumps, a group portrait of the Misses Armstrong painted by Sir John Everett Millais in 1872.

== Execution and aftermath ==
Sargent was commissioned to paint the Vickers sisters just before his 1884 exhibition of Portrait of Madame X, a painting which was met with controversy and negativity from critics and the general public, who felt that the painting was overly sexual. Though Sargent left Paris soon after the negative critiques of his portrait of Madame Gautreau and feared that he would lose the business of those who had already commissioned him for portraits, Colonel Vickers did not withdraw his request. In July, Sargent travelled to the Vickers’ estate in Sheffield to begin the portrait. Following the competition of the portrait of his daughters, Colonel Vickers commissioned portraits of his wife and sons, and eventually Sargent was commissioned to paint the portraits of thirteen members of the extended Vickers family. In addition to being their portraitist, Sargent knew the Vickers family on a personal level, and became a regular guest at family dinners and parties.

Following the wealthy, glamorous, and often-flashy clientele of Paris, Sargent viewed the commission from Colonel Vickers, a businessman and head of a well-respected family, as a regression from what his career had been. He described his subjects as "three ugly women" who "lived in a dingy hole", though the disdain he seems to have felt for his subjects is not readily apparent in the portrait itself. Sargent painted the sisters in fine day dresses with yards of material draping across their laps and spilling out of the sofa and chair they are seated upon. The presence of everyday objects, such as two cups of tea, a small pitcher of milk, and a piano, give the painting a casual tone. Although the scene is quiet, still, and contemplative, Sargent includes one detail of implied movement in the form of a book. The two sisters seated on the couch are flipping through a book, and though Sargent has painted all other elements in this scene with clarity, the pages of the book are blurred. Because of the objects within the scene and the positioning of the sisters, the scene manages to be both still and active at the same time, and the three Vickers sisters appear humble, despite their wealth.

== Reception ==
The Times of May 22, 1886, reviewed the painting as follows:

"Three young ladies, painted in a thin and almost ghostly fashion, gaze straight out of the picture at you. They seem as insubstantial as beings from another world; these faces, medicated rather than painted, these cloudy dresses, these unsubstantial chairs and tables, are they portraits or are they mere suggestions for portraits? Seeing the picture for the first time... one inevitably answers that they are mere sketches; that the artist no doubt intends to carry his work much further. But a second and a third examination bring one to a different mind, and almost, if not quite, convince one that this art, at once very bold and very subtle, is legitimate; that the painter has really got in this apparent slighting the truth about his sitters, and that no further touches could put more life or more character into face or form or accessories."

== See also ==
- List of works by John Singer Sargent
