= The Four Doctors (painting) =

1906 painting by John Singer Sargent

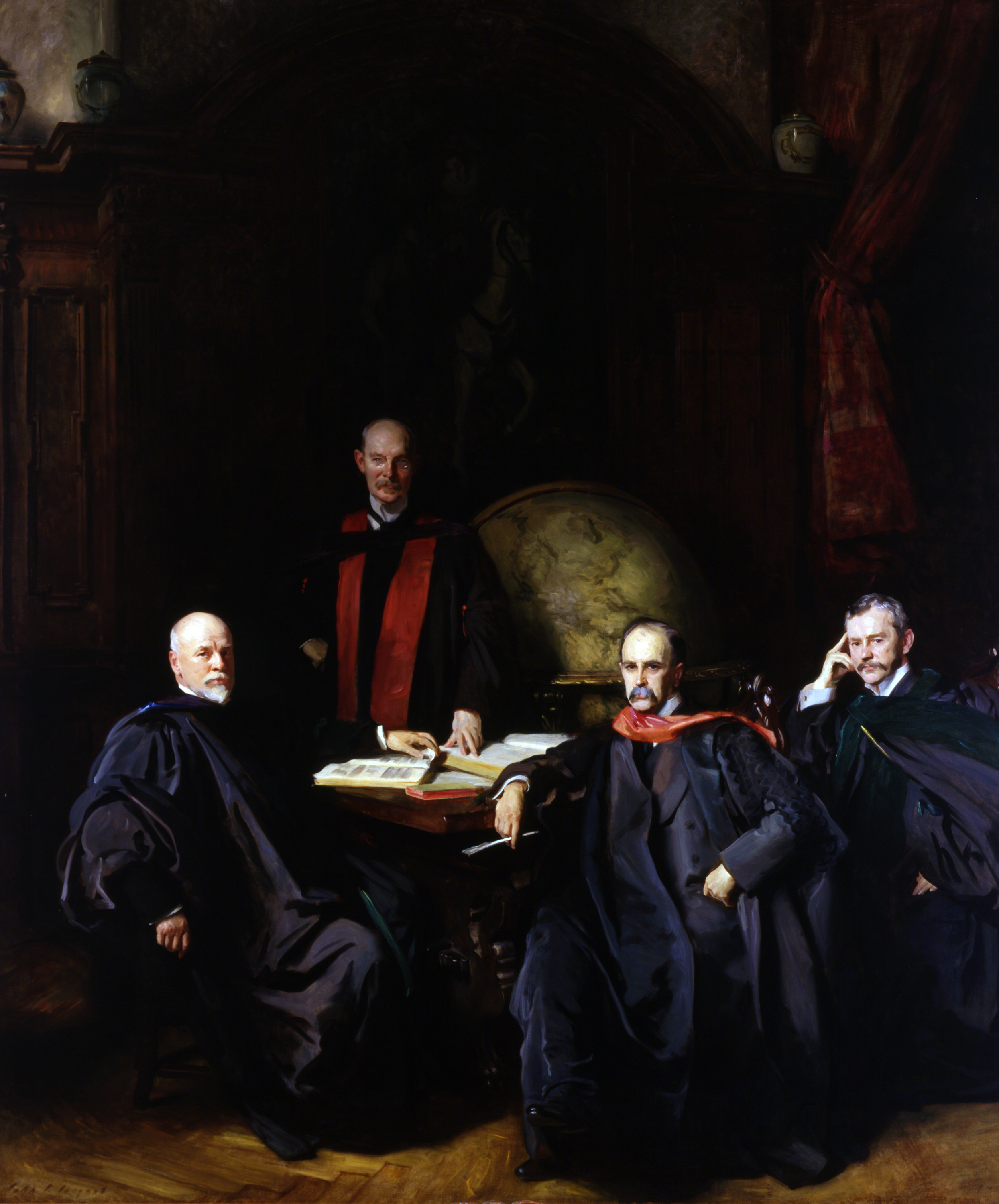
- William H. Welch, William Stewart Halsted, William Osler, and Howard Atwood Kelly
- Artist: John Singer Sargent
- Year: 1906
- Medium: Oil-on-canvas
- Dimensions: 3.28 m × 2.9 m (10.75 ft × 9.5 ft)
- Location: William H. Welch Medical Library, Johns Hopkins School of Medicine, Baltimore

The Four Doctors is a painting by the American artist John Singer Sargent. It depicts the Johns Hopkins Medical School faculty; William H. Welch, Howard Atwood Kelly, William Stewart Halsted, and William Osler. Measuring 10.72 ft by 9.5 ft, it is composed of four finely woven linen panels stitched together. It was completed in 1906 and first exhibited at the Royal Academy, London, before being unveiled on 19 January 1907 in Baltimore. It is currently in the William H. Welch Medical Library at Johns Hopkins School of Medicine in Baltimore.

The idea of commissioning the painting came from Johns Hopkins Medical School benefactress Mary Elizabeth Garrett in 1899, and in 1903 persuaded Sargent to produce a group portrait of the faculty members she most admired. In 1905, the four sitters posed together for Sargent at his studio in 33 Tite Street, London. Several arrangements were trialled before the final composition was chosen, which included a large globe and a backdrop of a replica of El Greco's St. Martin and the Beggar.

The finished painting was well received in Baltimore, with the artist Edwin Austin Abbey considering Osler the most striking figure. While it has been praised, it has also faced criticism for highlighting only four faculty members, thereby downplaying the contributions of others such as Franklin Paine Mall and John Jacob Abel. The work has appeared twice on the cover of the Journal of the American Medical Association and, in 2025, inspired Johns Hopkins' Four Doctors Awards.

== Description ==
The Four Doctors is an oil-on-canvas painting by John Singer Sargent, depicting four of the Johns Hopkins Medical School faculty co-founders; William H. Welch, Howard Atwood Kelly, William Stewart Halsted, and William Osler. Measuring approximately 328 cm by 277 cm, it is composed of four finely woven linen panels stitched together.

Despite experimenting with various arrangements, Sargent was dissatisfied until he introduced a large Venetian globe and El Greco's son, Jorge Manuel Theotocópuli's replica of St. Martin and the Beggar, into the composition. All four figures are seen in front of the fireplace at Sargent's studiio in 33 Tite Street, wearing their academic robes. Welch is shown holding a 1515 volume by Petrarch. Halsted stands directly in front of the globe.

== History ==
In 1899 Johns Hopkins Medical School benefactress Mary Elizabeth Garrett thought of the idea to commission a painting of Johns Hopkins founders. In 1903, she persuaded Sargent to produce a group portrait of the faculty members she most admired. (Note: The response from each physician remain in the Mary Elizabeth Garrett Collection at the Bryn Mawr College Archives.) Her earlier donation of more than $300,000 had enabled the medical school to open and she had already been recognised by a commissioned portrait from Sargent.

On 9 June 1905 the four sitters (Note: It is unclear whether Garrett selected the sitters independently or whether the choice was made in consultation with the trustees.) posed together for Sargent at his studio in 33 Tite Street, London, after four years of failed attempts to align their schedules. Several different arrangements of the sitters were tested before the final composition was settled, which occurred only after a large globe was brought into the studio, requiring part of the doorframe to be removed.

The painting took more than a year to complete, with Osler proving the most challenging sitter, according to Sargent. Sargent refused to depict him in his scarlet Oxford gown, remarking that he "knew all about that red", and noted the difficulty of capturing Osler's unusually olive complexion.

== Completion and response ==
The painting was completed in 1906 and was first exhibited at the Royal Academy, London. It was unveiled in Baltimore on 19 January 1907, and later placed in the William H. Welch Medical Library.

The artist Edwin Austin Abbey felt that Osler came across as the most striking. The completed work caused a "sensation" in Baltimore.

By canonising four physicians as the founders of Johns Hopkins Hospital, the painting has been criticised for diminishing the contributions of others, including Franklin Paine Mall and John Jacob Abel.

== Legacy ==
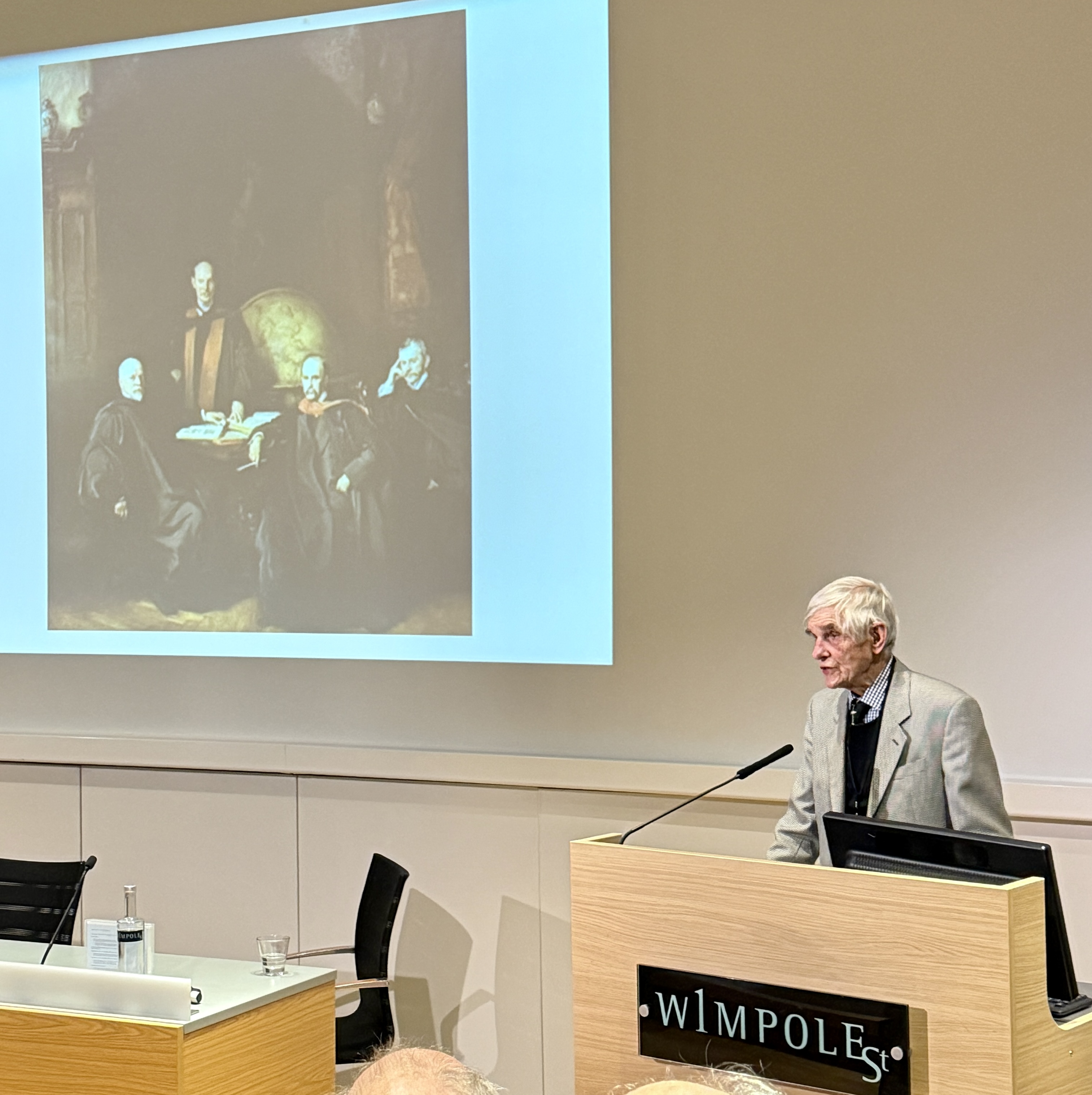
Richard Ormond with The Four Doctors, Royal Society of Medicine, London (2026)

The painting has appeared twice on the cover of the Journal of the American Medical Association. In 2025 it formed the inspiration of Johns Hopkin's Four Doctors Awards.

The longstanding myth that Sargent used deliberately fading pigments to make Halsted disappear has been discredited.

== See also ==
- List of works by John Singer Sargent
