= Cashmere (painting) =

Painting by John Singer Sargent

- Cashmere (English)
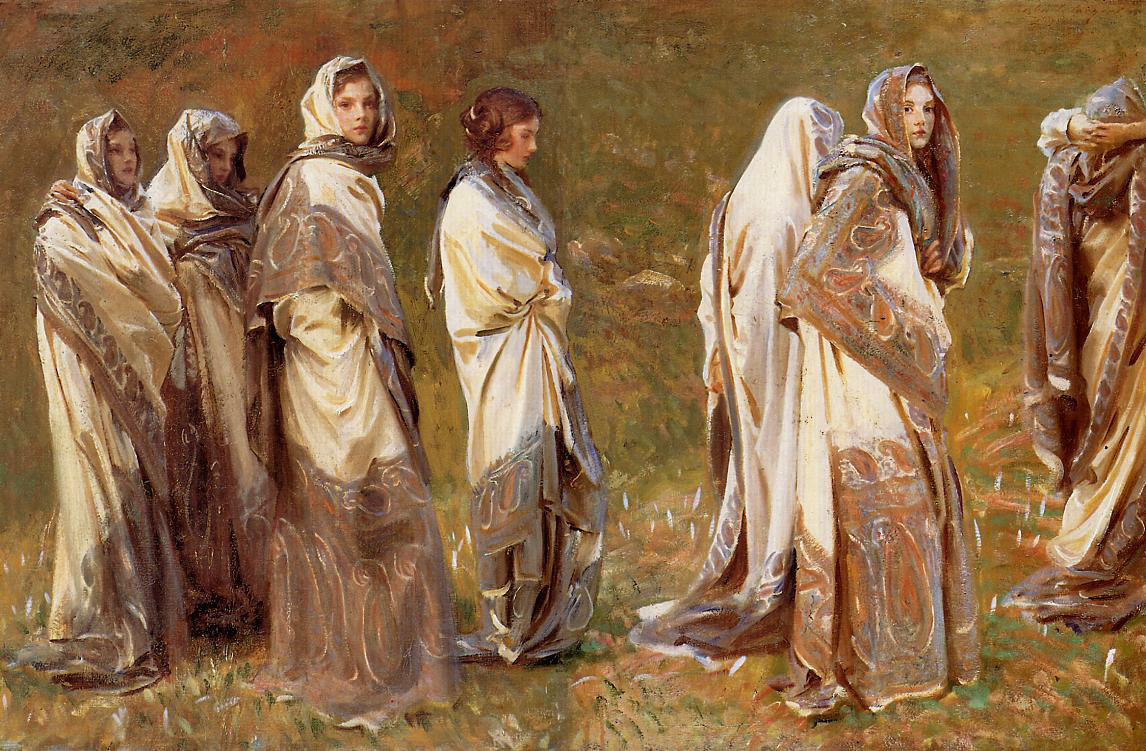
- Artist: John Singer Sargent
- Year: 1908
- Medium: Oil on canvas
- Dimensions: 71.1 cm × 109.2 cm (28.0 in × 43.0 in)

Cashmere (French: cachemire) is an oil painting by the American artist John Singer Sargent, in a private collection. It was completed in c.1908. The dimensions of the painting are 71.1 by 109.2 centimeters (28.0 in × 43.0 in).

== Description ==
The painting is of Sargent's niece, Reine Ormond, in an exotic cashmere shawl in seven different poses. Reine would have been about 11 years old. It was painted by Sargent when he was on holiday in the Italian Alps. Though the style is quite different, the representation of successive moments of a movement resembles Marcel Duchamp's 1912 Nude Descending a Staircase.

== See also ==
- List of works by John Singer Sargent
