= Tommies Bathing (John Singer Sargent) =

Painting by John Singer Sargent

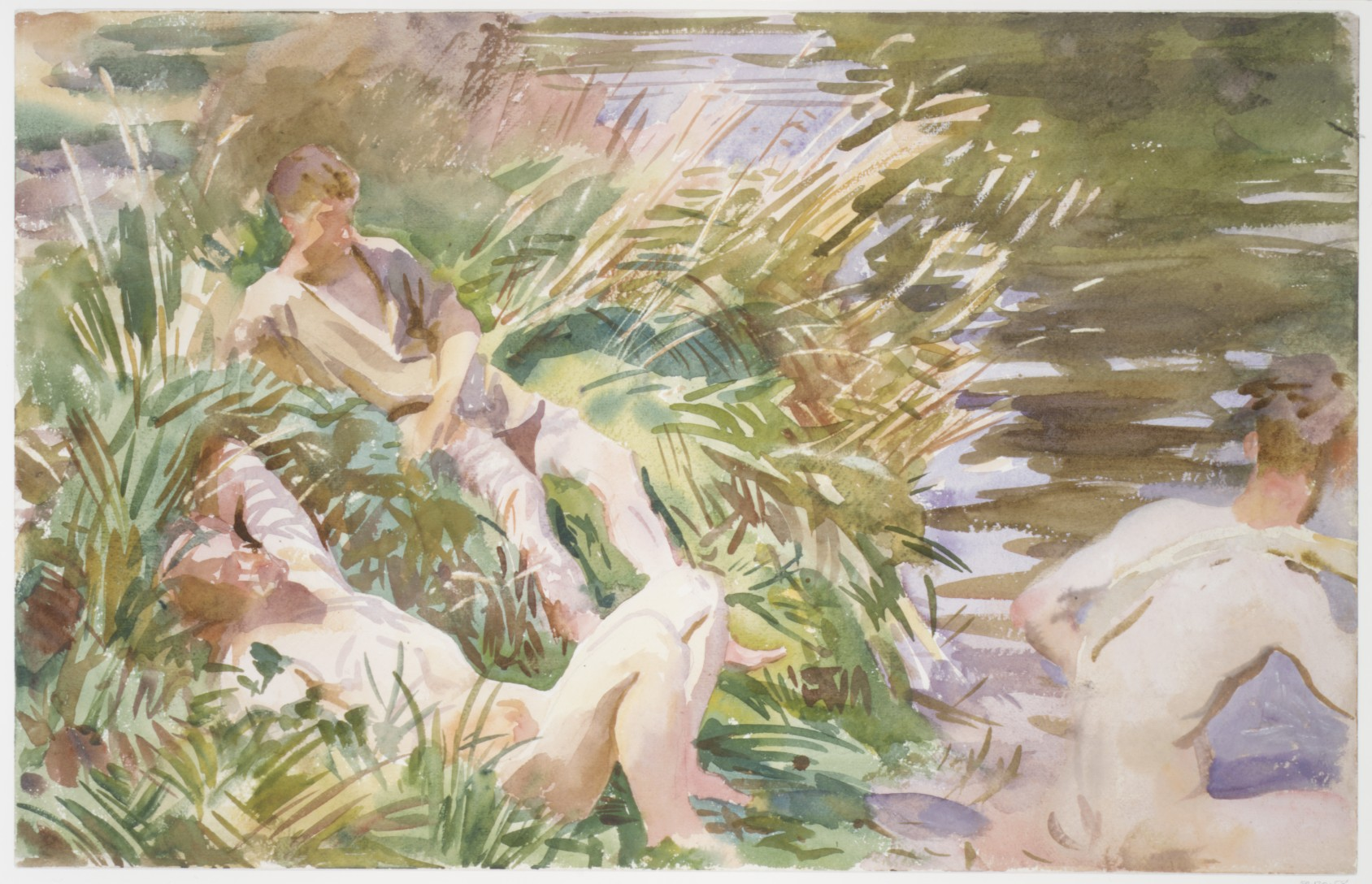
- Artist: John Singer Sargent
- Year: 1918
- Dimensions: 34.6 cm (13.6 in) × 53.2 cm (20.9 in)
- Location: Metropolitan Museum of Art
- Accession No.: 50.130.58
- Identifiers: The Met object ID: 12440

Tommies Bathing is a 1918 watercolor painting by John Singer Sargent. It is in the collection of the Metropolitan Museum of Art, in New York.

== Early history and creation ==
Sargent painted Tommies Bathing in the summer of 1918. The British government had commissioned him for a painting that would commemorate the efforts of the Americans and British in World War I, so he traveled to the front in the valley of the Somme to find a subject. During this time, he painted some informal watercolors, including Tommies Bathing. The name "Tommy" comes from "Thomas Atkins," the fictitious name the British Army used on official forms for private soldiers.

== Later history and display ==
The watercolor was a gift to the Metropolitan Museum of Art in 1950 from Mrs. Francis Ormond, Sargent's sister.

== Description and interpretation ==
The work depicts soldiers bathing, resting, and sleeping or napping, implying a narrative from the bathing soldier, to the soldier drying himself in the sunlight, to the partially dressed soldier. Sargent used a high, voyeuristic viewpoint and shows the men in a state of complete relaxation. He also captured the shadows cast across the bodies by blades of grass, with technical facility.

== See also ==
- List of works by John Singer Sargent
