= Street in Venice =

Painting by John Singer Sargent

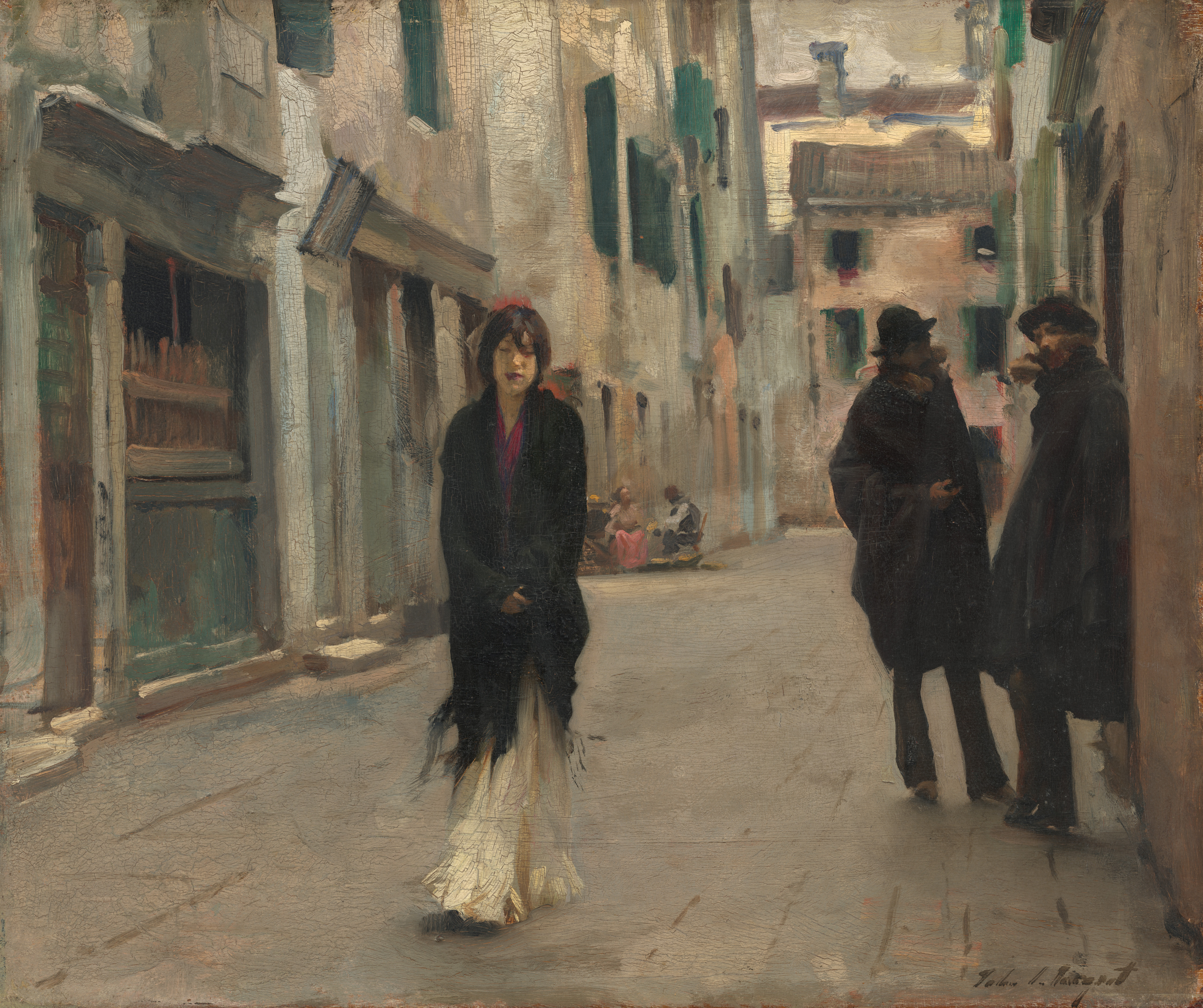
- Artist: John Singer Sargent
- Year: 1882
- Medium: Oil on Panel
- Dimensions: 45.1 cm × 53.9 cm (17.8 in × 21.2 in)
- Location: National Gallery of Art, Washington, D.C.

Street in Venice (or A Street Scene in Venice) is a c. 1882 oil on wood painting by the American artist John Singer Sargent (1856–1925). Painted in an Impressionist manner, it is set in a quiet backstreet off the Calle Larga dei Proverbi, near the Grand Canal in Venice. The painting shows a young woman, probably Venetian model Gigia Viani, walking along the flagstones, kicking her skirt with her right foot, and observed by two men in the shadows to her left. From the manner in which Sargent depicts her down-turned eyes and seemingly fast pace with which she passes the two men, he is concerned largely with the invasive male glare and its effect on the passing woman.

The painting is one of a number of Venetian scenes painted or drawn by Sargent, who spent most of his life in Europe, during his time in the city. As in his other works, it largely ignores the architectural aspects the city is best known for and focuses instead on edgy back-street imagery. The influence of Impressionism is evident in a number of this work's features, especially in the broad brush strokes of her dress and the unusual cropping of the composition. It is currently on display at the National Gallery of Art in Washington, D.C.

== Description ==
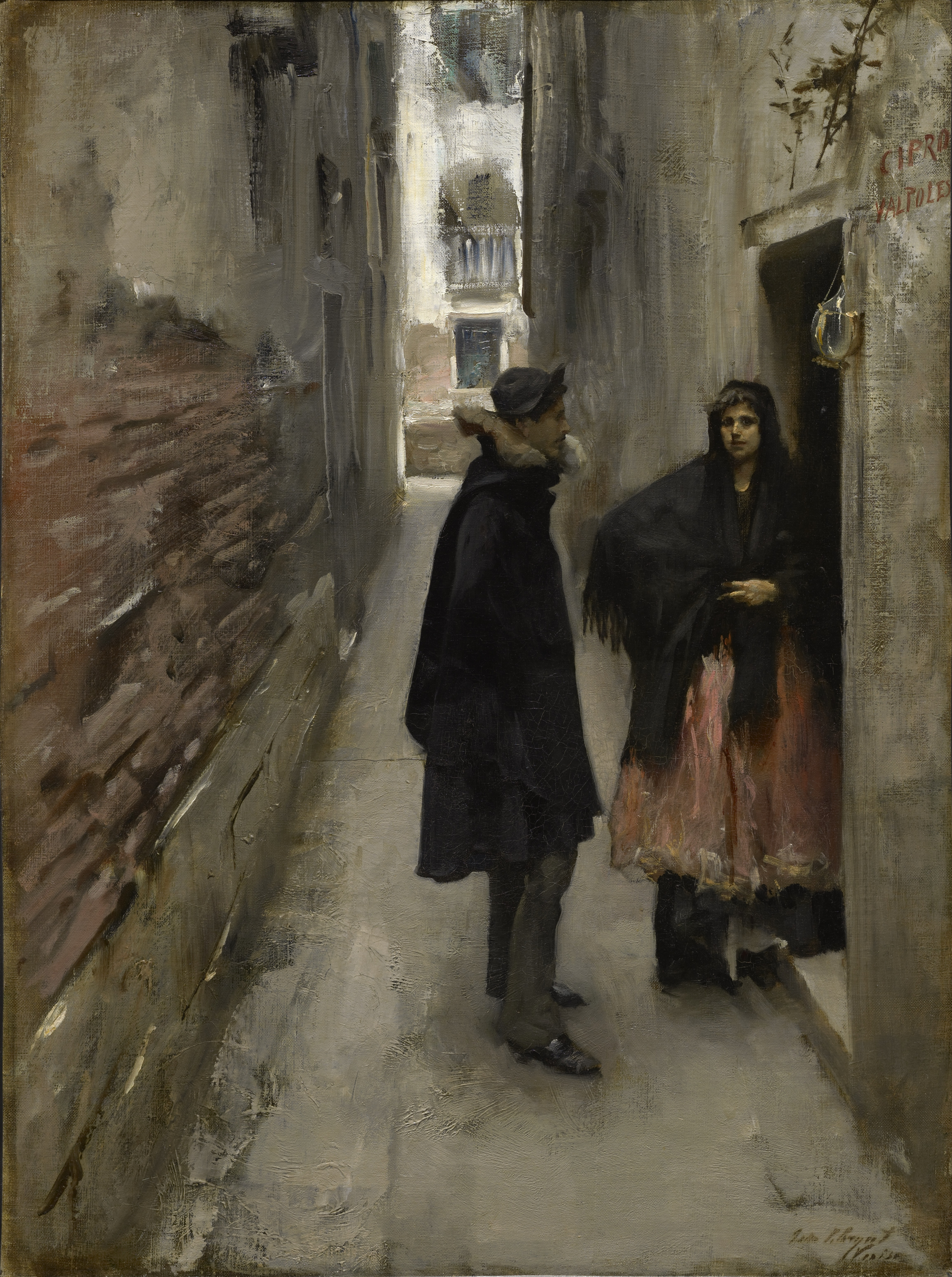
Sargent's A Street in Venice, 1880-81. This work contains similar use of chiaroscuro and geometrical framing

The woman is observed by one of two darkly coloured men huddled in conversation to the right of the frame. In the middle background a couple are seated outside of a cafe or bar, also deep in conversation. The couple are interested only in themselves, in contrast to the man. His gaze follows the girl, while her downcast eyes deliberately avoid their attention. Her shawl and skirt hem are shown flowing, suggesting that she is moving quickly past them. The Venice setting is significant; the artist has placed the moment away from the cosmopolitan surroundings of London, Paris, or New York – cities more familiar to him and which he considered more refined.

In composition and mood, the painting has been linked by the writer Margaret Conrads to the earlier Crossing the Street by Giovanni Boldini, who lived in Venice during 1880. Similar to Sargent's other Venetian scenes, the street is mostly darkened, the peripheral figures in shadow, while light spills on the buildings from the distance.

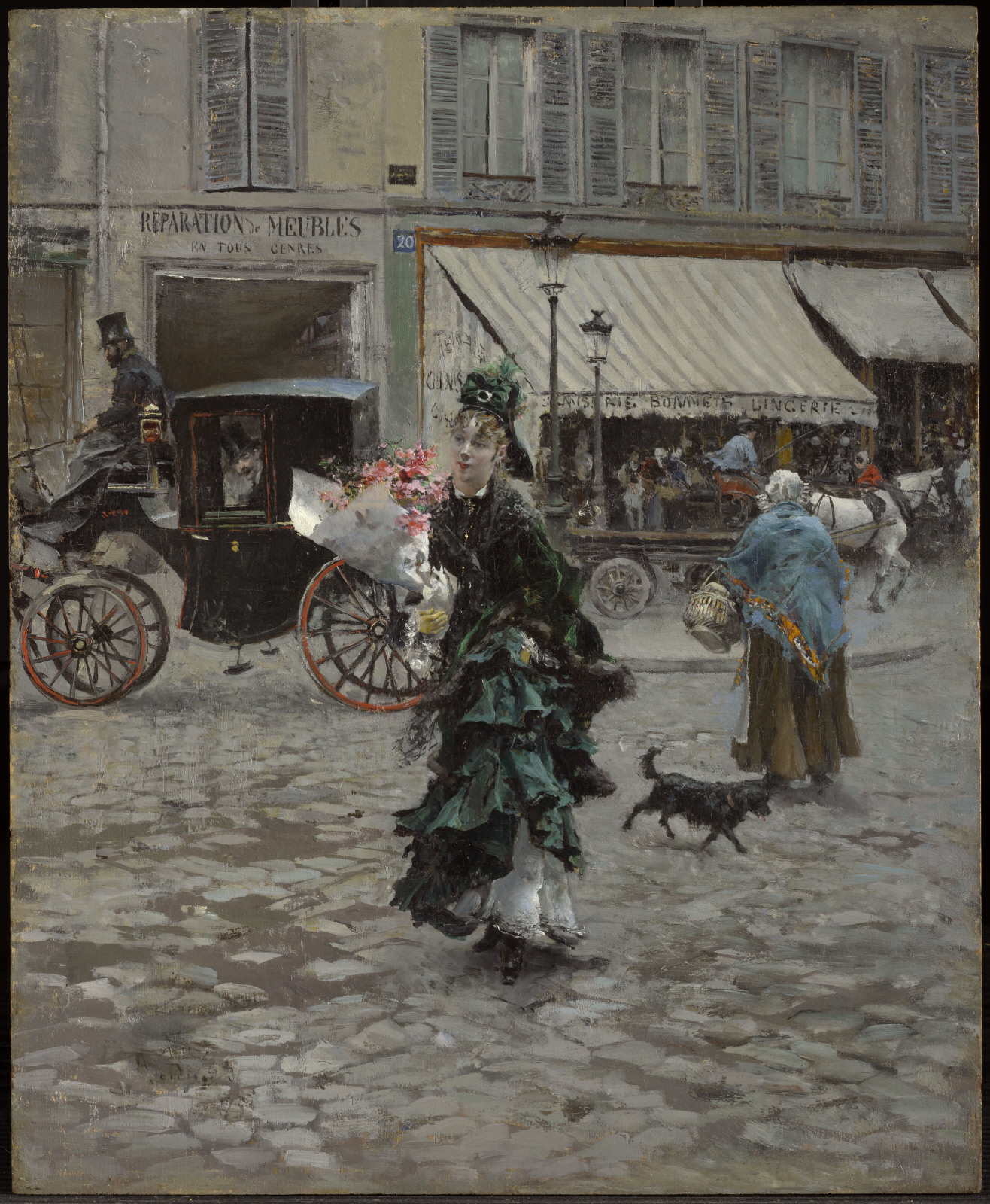
Crossing the Street, by Giovanni Boldini, 1875. Oil on canvas, 46 cm × 37.5 cm, Clark Art Institute, Williamstown

In its use of broad dark areas silhouetted against lighter ground used to give shape to the figures, it seems influenced by Diego Velázquez. That Sargent was influenced by photography of Venice, in particular by the works of Carlo Naya (1816–1882), can be seen the way the painting is closely cropped, and in the almost photographic freeze-frame capturing of movement in a moment in time.

The painting is composed as a series of descending rectangles arranged in a near-telescopic manner, outside of which a section of blue sky lightens the claustrophobic tone marked by the descending angles which meet at the girl's head. It is largely rendered in monochrome, though there are touches of red in the girl's head comb, dress, and in the cafe behind her. However, overall the artist is more concerned with tone than colour.

== Provenance ==
Street in Venice was first exhibited in 1882 at the Galerie Georges Petit in Paris. It was purchased by Elizabeth Chanler of Boston in 1888, who gave it to the American architect Stanford White in return for professional services. In 1962, the painting was acquired by the National Gallery of Art, Washington, where it is on permanent display.

== See also ==
- List of works by John Singer Sargent

== Sources ==
- Adelson, Warren. In Ormond, Richard: Sargent's Venice. Yale University Press, 2006. ISBN 0-300-11717-5
- Conrads, Margaret. American Paintings and Sculpture at the Sterling and Francine Clark Art Institute. Hudson Hills Press LLC, 1991. ISBN 1-55595-050-7
- Fairbrother, Trevor. "The Sensualist". Southwest Art, Volume 30, Issue 7, December 2000.
