= Portrait of Mrs. Cecil Wade =

Painting by John Singer Sargent

Portrait of Mrs. Cecil Wade (Portrait of a Lady)
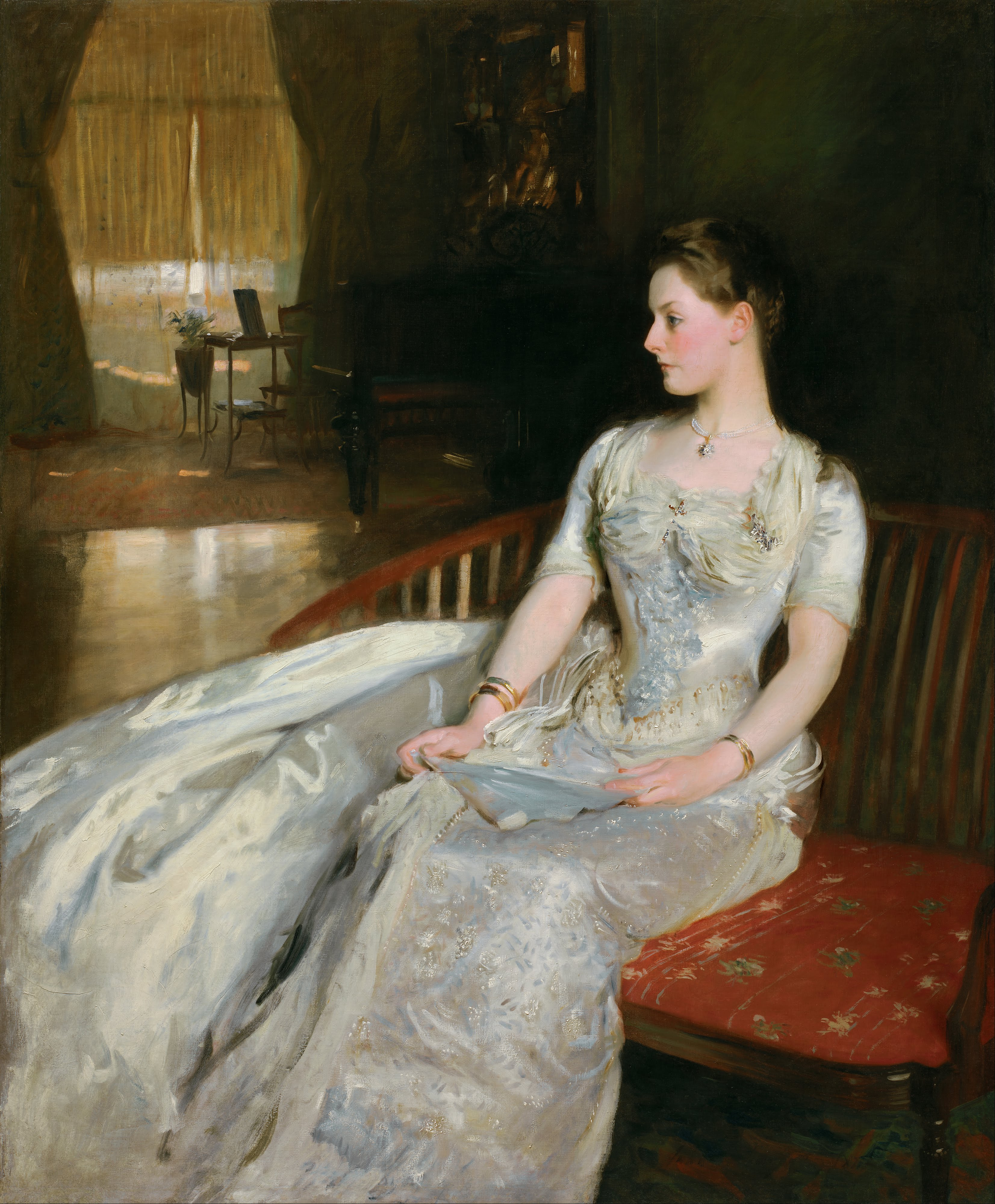
- Artist: John Singer Sargent
- Year: 1886
- Medium: Oil on canvas
- Dimensions: 167.64 cm × 137.8 cm (66 in × 54.25 in)
- Location: Nelson-Atkins Museum of Art, Kansas City, MO

Portrait of Mrs. Cecil Wade or Portrait of a Lady is a large oil-on-canvas painting by John Singer Sargent, depicting Frances Frew Wade, a Scottish socialite. Painted in 1886, it currently hangs in the Nelson-Atkins Museum of Art in Kansas City, Missouri.

== Background ==
After the scandal caused by Sargent’s Portrait of Madame X at the Paris Salon of 1884, the artist lost much of his French clientele and relocated to England in 1886 in search of new commissions. Sargent’s Portrait of Mrs. Cecil Wade was his first major project after the 1884 Salon and formally retreats from many of the controversial aspects of Madame X.

Mrs. Cecil Wade (née Frances Mackay Frew; June 17, 1863 – December 30, 1908) was born in Glasgow, Scotland, and married London stockbroker Cecil Lowry Wade (1857 – 1908) in 1883. She was 23 years old when she sat for Sargent in her London home, wearing the white satin gown she wore to be presented before Queen Victoria.

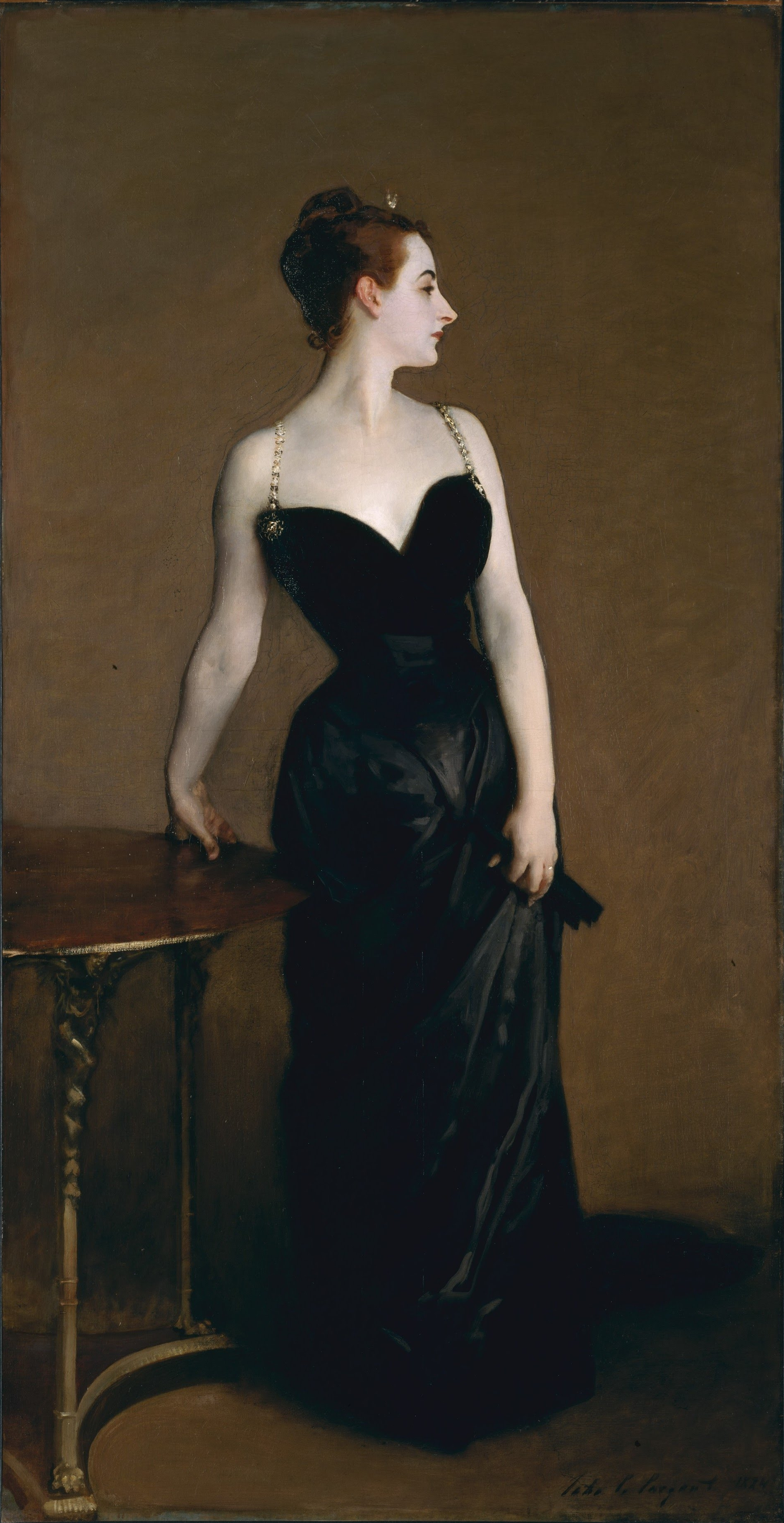
Portrait of Madame X (Madame Pierre Gautreau), John Singer Sargent, 1884

== Description ==
Portrait of Mrs. Cecil Wade shows Sargent's virtuosity in painting both portraits and interiors, as well as his willingness to boldly experiment with light and darkness. The painting features a full-length rendering of Mrs. Wade in profile glancing to her right, her body portrayed at a sight angle, with a bright light washing over her fair skin and white satin dress. She sits on a wooden bench upholstered with a red floral cushion, and is adorned with sparkling bracelets and a choker in addition to a white fan.

In the dimly lit background, midday light trickles in through a window covered by a yellow curtain and illuminates a small table and chair with a plant nearby.

== Exhibition history ==
Portrait of Mrs. Cecil Wade was exhibited once during Sargent’s life, in 1887 at an exhibition of artists calling themselves the New English Art Club at the Dudley Gallery in London.

The painting was also included in two posthumous exhibitions of Sargent’s work, once in 1925 at the Walker Art Gallery in Liverpool, England, and again in 1926 at the Royal Academy of Arts in London.

After its acquisition by the Nelson-Atkins Museum of Art in 1986, Portrait of Mrs. Cecil Wade was featured in three additional special exhibitions. The first was an exhibition of selected new acquisitions at the Nelson-Atkins Museum in 1987, in which it received special distinction amongst the other highlighted works.

The painting then was included in Made in America: Ten Centuries of American Art a traveling exhibition of American paintings. Between 1995 and 1996 the exhibition visited four major American Museums: the Minneapolis Institute of Arts in Minnesota, Saint Louis Art Museum in Missouri, Toledo Museum of Art in Ohio, and Carnegie Museum of Art in Pittsburgh, PA, in addition to a stop at the Nelson-Atkins Museum.

Most recently, Portrait of Mrs. Cecil Wade was included in a 1997 exhibition featuring paintings from Sargent’s early career at the Clark Art Institute in Williamstown, MA.

== Provenance ==
After the 1908 death of the sitter, Francis Frew Wade (who had owned and kept the painting in London since 1886), the piece passed into the ownership of her daughter, Aileen Wade, who remained living in London. Aileen Wade bequeathed the painting to her nephew, Sir Ruthven L. Wade, and he received the work in 1955. It was under his ownership in Dinton, England until 1986, when it was auctioned at Sotheby’s New York and bought by the Enid and Crosby Kemper Foundation in Kansas City, Missouri. In 1986, Enid and Crosby Kemper gifted the painting to the Nelson-Atkins Museum of Art, where it currently hangs prominently in the Sarah and Landon Rowland American art galleries.

== Critical reception ==
At its debut in the New English Art Club exhibition in 1887, Portrait of Mrs. Cecil Wade was given very mixed reviews. F.D. Maurice and Charles Kingsley from The Spectator extolled the "individuality and life in the face of the sitter," while also chastising its "forced" use of light in the foreground and "cold" manner in which the painting was executed, resulting in "no hint of tenderness, no suspicion of poetry" in the work at large. Furthermore, while the Saturday Review (London) praised Sargent, who "[sent] a brilliant and admirably handled likeness of a lady in white (cat. no. 55) against a charmingly painted interior," the Illustrated London News noted once more Sargent's disregard for the personhood of Mrs. Wade, stating that "Mr. Sargent's 'Portrait of a Lady' (cat. no. 55) in white satin suggests that her arms and face were made of cardboard".

At its acquisition by the Nelson-Atkins Museum in 1986, the painting was regarded as "a stellar example of Sargent's work", and fetched the highest price ever paid for a Sargent painting at that time.

== See also ==
- List of works by John Singer Sargent
