= Padre Sebastiano =

Painting by John Singer Sargent

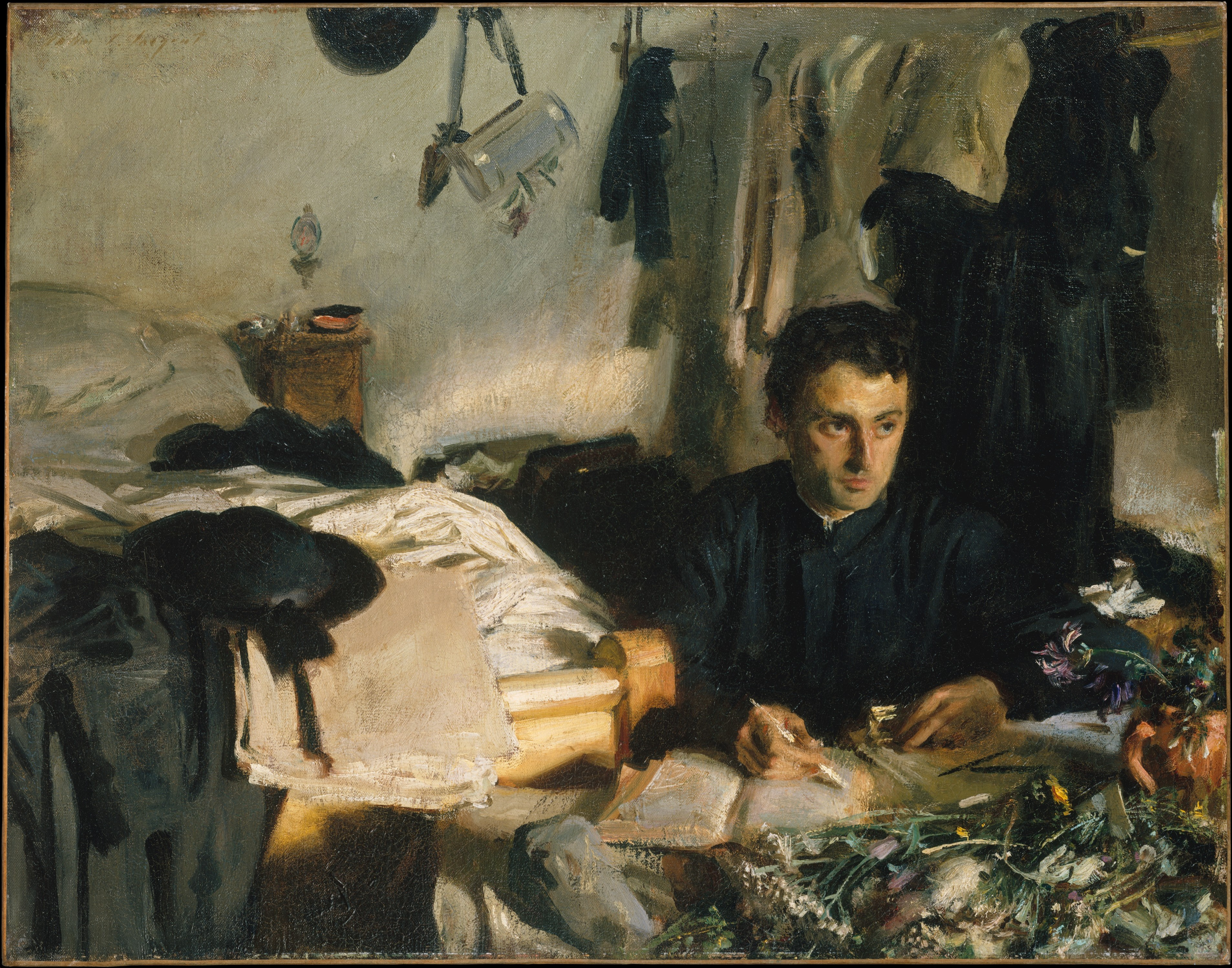
- Padre Sebastiano
- Artist: John Singer Sargent
- Year: c. 1904–06
- Medium: Oil on canvas
- Dimensions: 56.5 cm × 71.1 cm (22.2 in × 28.0 in)
- Location: Metropolitan Museum of Art; New York
- Accession: 11.30

Padre Sebastiano is a 1904–1906 painting by John Singer Sargent. It is part of the collection of the Metropolitan Museum of Art.

The painting depicts Father Sebastiano, an Italian priest whom the artist met in Giomein, a village in the Italian Alps. The subject had a serious interest in botany, hence the wild flowers.

The work is on view in the Metropolitan Museum's Gallery 770.

== See also ==
- List of works by John Singer Sargent
- 1906 in art
