= List of works by John Singer Sargent =

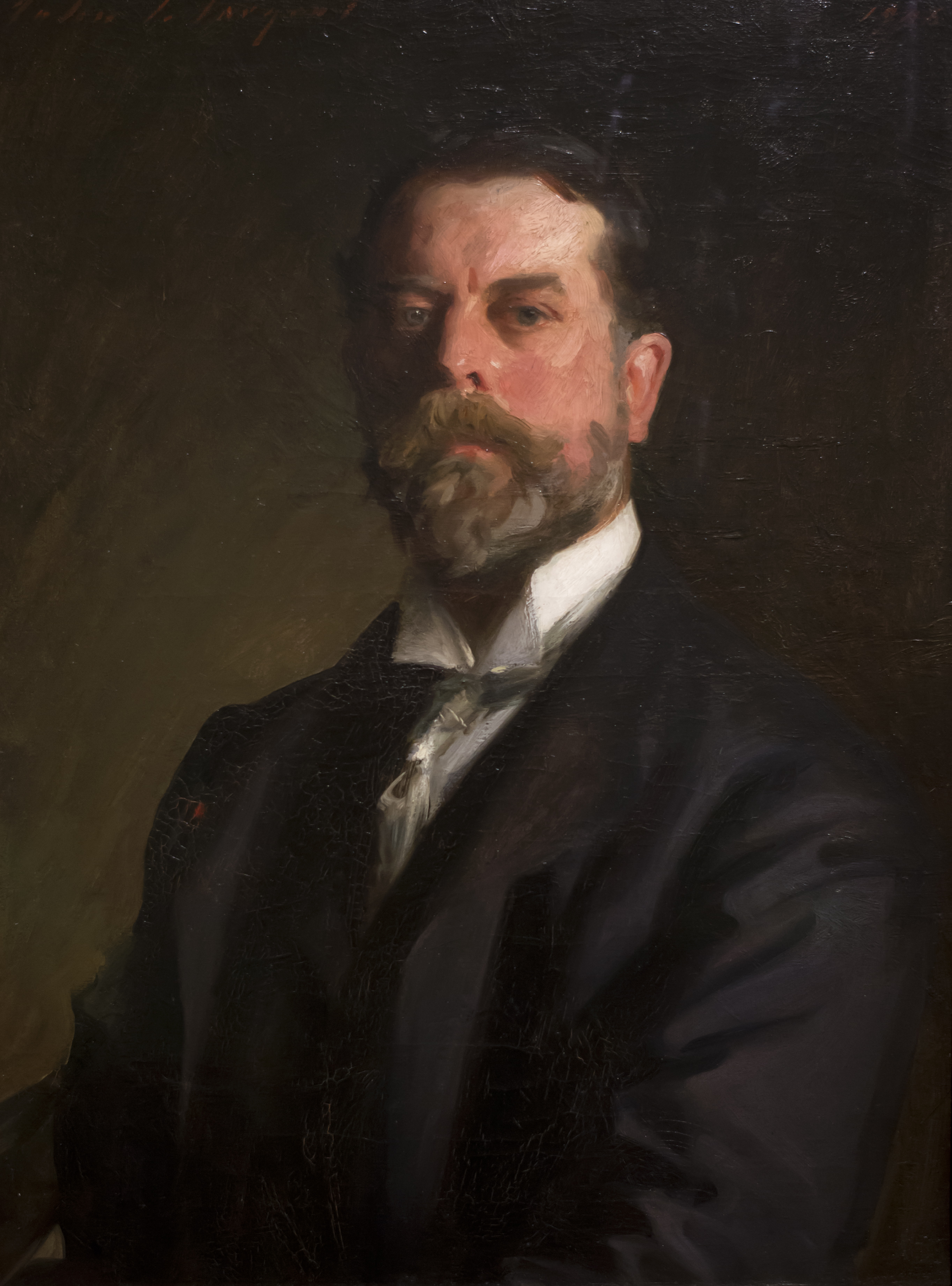
Self-portrait, 1906, Uffizi Gallery, Florence.

John Singer Sargent was an American artist, considered the "leading portrait painter of his generation" for his evocations of Edwardian era luxury. During his career, he created roughly 900 oil paintings and more than 2,000 watercolors, as well as countless sketches and charcoal drawings. His oeuvre documents worldwide travel, from Venice to the Tyrol, Corfu, Spain, the Middle East, Montana, Maine, and Florida.

From the beginning his work was characterized by remarkable technical facility, particularly in his ability to draw with a brush, which in later years inspired admiration as well as criticism for a supposed superficiality. His commissioned works were consistent with the grand manner of portraiture, while his informal studies and landscape paintings displayed a familiarity with Impressionism.

In later life Sargent expressed ambivalence about the restrictions of formal portrait work, and devoted much of his energy to mural painting and working en plein air.

== Works ==
Painting	Name	Year	Type	Technique	Dimensions	Current Location
	Frau von Allmen and an Unidentified Man in an Interior, verso (from "Splendid Mountain Watercolours" Sketchbook)	1870	Portrait	Watercolor and graphite on off-white wove paper	28 cm × 41 cm 10 7/8 in × 16 in	Metropolitan Museum of Art, New York
	Frank O'Meara	1876	Portrait	Oil on canvas	44.45 cm × 39.37 cm 17 1/2 in × 15 1/2 in	Private collection
	Portrait of Fanny Watts	1877	Portrait	Oil on canvas	105.9 cm × 81.3 cm 41 11/16 in × 32 in	Philadelphia Museum of Art
	Setting Out to Fish	1878	Landscape	Oil on cardboard	77 cm × 121.6 cm 30 5/16 in × 47 7/8 in	National Gallery of Art
	Rosina Ferrara	1878	Portrait	Oil on cardboard	49.53 cm × 41.27 cm 19 1/2 in × 16 1/4 in	Denver Art Museum
	Head of a Young Man	1878	Portrait	Oil on panel	22.3 cm × 12.2 cm 8 3/4 in × 4 13/16 in	Private collection
	Staircase in Capri	1878	Landscape	Oil on canvas	80 cm × 44 cm 31 1/2 in × 17 5/16 in	Private collection
	A Capriote, Rosina Ferrara	1878	Landscape	Oil on canvas	76.8 cm × 63.2 cm 30 1/4 in × 24 7/8 in	Museum of Fine Arts, Boston
	Capri Girl on a Rooftop (Rosina Ferrara doing a tarantella dance on a rooftop.)	1878	Landscape	Oil on canvas	50.8 cm × 63.5 cm 20 in × 25 in	Crystal Bridges Museum of American Art
	Head of a Capri Girl	1878	Portrait	Oil on canvas	43.2 cm × 30.5 cm 17 in × 12 in	Private collection
	Nude Boy on the Beach	1878	Portrait	Oil on panel	26.8 cm × 35.1 cm 10 9/16 in × 13 13/16 in	Tate Britain, London
	Rosina	1878	Portrait	Oil on canvas	35.56 cm × 17.15 cm 14 in × 6 3/4 in	Colby College Museum of Art
	Young Man in Reverie	1878	Portrait	Oil on canvas		The Museum of Fine Arts, Houston
	Carmela Bertagna	1879	Portrait	Oil on canvas	59.7 cm × 49.5 cm 23 1/2 in × 19 1/2 in	Columbus Museum of Art, Ohio
	A Moroccan Street Scene	1879	Landscape	Oil on wood	34.9 cm × 26 cm 13 3/4 in × 10 1/4 in	Yale University Art Gallery, New Haven.
	Alhambra, Patio de la Reja	1879	Landscape	Oil on canvas	46.03 cm × 54.61 cm 18 1/8 in × 21 1/2 in	Private collection
	In the Luxembourg Gardens	1879	Landscape	Oil on canvas	65.7 cm × 92.4 cm 25 7/8 in × 36 3/8 in	Philadelphia Museum of Art, Pennsylvania
	Portrait of Carolus-Duran	1879	Portrait	Oil on canvas	116.8 cm × 95.9 cm 46 in × 37 3/4 in	Clark Art Institute, Massachusetts
	Édouard Pailleron	1879	Portrait	Oil on canvas	127 cm × 94 cm 50 in × 37 in	Musée National du Château de Versailles
	Madame Édouard Pailleron (Marie Buloz)	1879	Portrait	Oil on canvas	208.3 cm × 100.4 cm 82 in × 39 1/2 in	National Gallery of Art, Washington D.C.
	Venetian onion seller	1880–82	Portrait	Oil on canvas	90.0 cm × 70.0 cm 35.43 in × 27.55 in	Thyssen-Bornemisza Museum, Madrid
	A street in Venice	1880–82	Landscape	Oil on canvas	75 cm × 52 cm 29.5 in × 20.6 in	Clark Art Institute, Williamstown, Massachusetts
	Jean-Joseph Carriès	c. 1880	Portrait	Oil on canvas	55.9 cm × 46.4 cm 22 in × 18.25 in	Sheldon Museum of Art, University of Nebraska–Lincoln
	Madame Ramón Subercaseaux Vicuña (Amalia Errázuriz y Urmeneta)	c. 1880	Portrait	Oil on panel	165 cm × 110 cm 65 in × 43 1/4 in	Private collection
	Ramón Subercaseaux Vicuña	c. 1880	Portrait	Oil on panel	35.4 cm × 26.7 cm 13 15/16 in × 10 1/2 in	Saint Louis Art Museum, Missouri
	Fumée d'Ambre Gris	1880	Portrait	Oil on canvas	138.1 cm × 90.6 cm 54 3/8 in × 35 11/16 in	Clark Art Institute, Williamstown, Massachusetts
	Francis Brooks Chadwick	1880	Portrait	Oil on panel	35 cm × 25 cm 13 3/4 in × 10 in	Private collection
	George Hitchcock	1880	Portrait	Watercolor on paper	21.6 cm × 29 cm 8 1/2 in × 11 7/16 in	Private collection
	Ramón Subercaseaux Vicuña	1880	Portrait	Oil on canvas	47 cm × 63.5 cm 18 1/2 in × 25 in	Dixon Gallery and Gardens, Memphis, Tennessee
	Spanish Dancer	1880–81	Portrait	Oil on canvas	223 cm × 151 cm 87.7 in × 59.5 in	Private collection
	Dr. Robert Farquharson of Finzean	1881	Portrait	Oil on canvas	61.4 cm × 51.2 cm 24 3/16 in × 20 3/16 in	Aberdeen Art Gallery, Scotland
	Dr. Pozzi at Home	1881	Portrait	Oil on canvas	201.6 cm × 102.2 cm 79 3/8 in × 40 1/4 in	Hammer Museum, University of California, Los Angeles
	Portrait of Edouard and Marie-Louise Pailleron (Édouard Pailleron's children)	1881	Portrait	Oil on canvas	152.4 cm × 175.3 cm 60 in × 69 in	Des Moines Art Center, Iowa
	Vernon Lee (Violet Paget)	1881	Portrait	Oil on canvas	53.7 cm × 43.2 cm 21 1/8 in × 17 in	Tate Britain, London
	Head of an Italian Woman	c. 1881	Portrait	Oil on canvas		Arkell Museum, Canajoharie, New York
	Albert de Belleroche	c. 1882	Portrait	Oil on canvas	61 cm × 45.7 cm 24 in × 18 in	Private collection
	Albert de Belleroche	c. 1882	Portrait	Oil on canvas	67.3 cm × 48.3 cm 26 1/2 in × 19 in	Colorado Springs Fine Arts Center, Colorado
	Street in Venice	c. 1882	Landscape	Oil on Panel	45.1 cm × 53.9 cm 17 3/4 in × 21 1/4 in	National Gallery of Art, Washington, D.C.
	A Venetian Woman	1882	Portrait	Oil on canvas	238.2 cm × 133 cm 93 3/4 in × 52 3/8 in	Cincinnati Art Museum, Ohio
	Paul César Helleu	c. 1882–1885	Portrait	Watercolor on paper	23.5 cm × 37.3 cm 9 1/4 in × 14 11/16 in	Private collection
	Miss Beatrice Townsend	1882	Portrait	Oil on canvas	79.4 cm × 58.4 cm 31 1/4 in × 23 in	National Gallery of Art, Washington, D.C.
	The Daughters of Edward Darley Boit	1882	Portrait	Oil on canvas	221.9 cm × 222.6 cm 87 3/8 in × 87 5/8 in	Museum of Fine Arts, Boston, Massachusetts
	El Jaleo	1882	Portrait	Oil on canvas	237 cm × 352 cm 93 in × 139 in	Isabella Stewart Gardner Museum, Boston
	Lady with the Rose (Charlotte Louise Burckhardt)	1882	Portrait	Oil on canvas	213 cm × 114 cm 84 in × 44 3/4 in	Metropolitan Museum of Art, New York
	Mrs. Daniel Sargent Curtis (Ariana Randolph Wormeley)	1882	Portrait	Oil on canvas	71.1 cm × 53.3 cm 28 in × 21 in	Spencer Museum of Art, University of Kansas
	Madame Eugenia Errázuriz or The Lady in Black	c. 1882–1883	Portrait	Oil on canvas	81.9 cm × 59.7 cm 32 1/4 in × 23 1/2 in	Private collection
	Mrs. Henry White (Margaret Stuyvesant Rutherfurd)	1883	Portrait	Oil on canvas	220 cm × 140 cm 87 in × 55 in	Corcoran Gallery of Art, Washington, D.C.
	Madame X (Madame Pierre Gautreau, née Virginie Avegno)	1883–84	Portrait	Oil on canvas	208.6 cm × 109.9 cm 82 1/8 in × 43 1/4 in	Metropolitan Museum of Art, New York
	Mrs. Harry Vane Milbank (Alice Sidonie Vandenburg, Albert de Belleroche's mother)	1883–1884	Portrait	Oil on canvas	188.6 cm × 90.8 cm 74 1/4 in × 35 3/4 in	Private collection
	Edward Vickers (Thomas Vickers's nephew)	c. 1884	Portrait	Oil on canvas	50.8 cm × 35.6 cm 20 in × 14 in	Private collection
	Madame Belleroche (Albert de Belleroche's mother)	c. 1884	Portrait	Oil on canvas	55.2 cm × 45.7 cm 21 3/4 in × 18 in	Private collection
	Miss Dorothy Vickers (Thomas Vickers's daughter)	c. 1884	Portrait	Oil on canvas	45.72 cm × 38.1 cm 18 in × 15 in	Private collection
	Auguste Rodin	1884	Portrait	Oil on canvas	73 cm × 53 cm 28 3/4 in × 20 7/8 in	Musée Rodin, Paris
	Garden Study of Thomas Vickers's Children	1884	Portrait	Oil on canvas	137.6 cm × 91.1 cm 54 3/16 in × 35 7/8 in	Flint Institute of Arts, Michigan
	Mademoiselle Suzanne Poirson	1884	Portrait	Oil on canvas	65 cm × 50 cm 25 1/2 in × 19 1/2 in	Private collection
	Louis de Fourcaud	1884	Portrait	Oil on canvas	60 cm × 49.7 cm 23 5/8 in × 19 9/16 in	Musée d'Orsay, Paris
	Mrs. Albert Vickers (Edith Foster, Thomas Vickers's sister-in-law)	1884	Portrait	Oil on canvas	210.2 cm × 101.1 cm 82 3/4 in × 39 13/16 in	Virginia Museum of Fine Arts, Richmond, Virginia
	The Dinner Table (Mr. and Mrs. Albert Vickers, Thomas Vickers's brother)	1884	Portrait	Oil on canvas	51.4 cm × 66.7 cm 20 1/4 in × 26 1/4 in	De Young Museum, San Francisco, California
	The Misses Vickers	1884	Portrait	Oil on canvas	166 cm × 212 cm 65.5 in × 83.5 in	Weston Park Museum, Sheffield
	Claude Monet Painting by the Edge of a Wood	1885	Landscape	Oil on canvas	54.0 cm × 64.8 cm 21 1/4 in × 25 1/2 in	Tate Britain, London
	Arsène Vigeant	1885	Portrait	Oil on canvas	52 cm × 51 cm 20 1/2 in × 20 1/16 in	Metz Museum
	Dorothy Barnard (Fred Barnard's daughter)	1885	Portrait	Oil on canvas	72.39 cm × 49.53 cm 28 1/2 in × 19 1/2 in	Private collection
	Madame Paul Poirson	1885	Portrait	Oil on canvas	152.4 cm × 86.4 cm 60 in × 34 in	Detroit Institute of Arts
	Robert Louis Stevenson and His Wife	1885	Portrait	Oil on canvas	52.1 cm × 62.2 cm 20 1/2 in × 24 1/2 in	Crystal Bridges Museum of American Art, Bentonville, Arkansas
	Carnation, Lily, Lily, Rose	1885–1886	Landscape	Oil on canvas	174 cm × 153.7 cm 68 1/2 in × 60 1/2 in	Tate Britain, London
	Mrs. Francis Davis Millet (Elizabeth ("Lily") Greely Merrill)	1885–1886	Portrait	Oil on canvas	87.3 cm × 67.3 cm 34 3/8 in × 26 1/2 in	Private collection
	Sally Fairchild (Charles Fairchild's daughter)	c. 1885–1887	Portrait	Oil on canvas	67 cm × 50.8 cm 26 3/8 in × 20 in	Iris & B. Gerald Cantor Center for Visual Arts Stanford University, Palo Alto, California
	Poppies	1886	Landscape	Oil on canvas	61.9 cm × 91.1 cm 24 3/8 in × 35 7/8 in	Private collection
	Self-portrait	1886	Portrait	Oil on canvas	34.5 cm × 29.7 cm 13 9/16 in × 11 11/16 in	Aberdeen Art Gallery, Scotland.
	Jacques-Émile Blanche	c. 1886	Portrait	Oil on canvas	82.1 cm × 60.0 cm 32 5/16 in × 23 5/8 in	Musée des Beaux-Arts de Rouen
	Brigadier General Archibald Campbell Douglas	1886	Portrait	Oil on canvas	162 cm × 91 cm 63 3/4 in × 35 3/4 in	Private collection
	Edmund Gosse	1886	Portrait	Oil on canvas	54.6 cm × 44.5 cm 21 1/2 in × 17 1/2 in	National Portrait Gallery, London
	Mrs. Cecil Wade	1886	Portrait	Oil on canvas	167.6 cm × 137.8 cm 66 in × 54 1/4 in	Nelson-Atkins Museum of Art, Kansas City, Missouri
	Mrs. Douglas Dick (Isabelle Parrott, Archibald Campbell Douglas's wife)	1886	Portrait	Oil on canvas	160 cm × 91 cm 63 in × 36 in	Private collection
	Lady and Child Asleep in a Punt under the Willows	1887	Landscape	Oil on canvas	56 cm × 68.6 cm 22 1/16 in × 27 in	Calouste Gulbenkian Museum, Lisbon
	Caspar Goodrich	1887	Portrait	Oil on canvas	66.3 cm × 48.6 cm 26 1/8 in × 19 1/8 in	Private collection
	Elizabeth Allen Marquand	1887	Portrait	Oil on canvas	169.0 cm × 107.0 cm 66 9/16 in × 42 1/8 in	Princeton University Art Museum, New Jersey
	Mrs. Charles E. Inches (Louise Pomeroy)	1887	Portrait	Oil on canvas	86.3 cm × 60.6 cm 34 in × 23 7/8 in	Museum of Fine Arts, Boston
	Laurence Millet (Francis Davis Millet's son)	1887	Portrait	Oil on canvas	76.2 cm × 50.80 cm 30 in × 20 in	Fenimore Art Museum, Cooperstown, New York
	Robert Louis Stevenson	1887	Portrait	Oil on canvas	50.8 cm × 61.6 cm 20 in × 24 1/4 in	Taft Museum of Art, Ohio
	Alice Vanderbilt Shepard	1888	Portrait	Oil on canvas	73.7 cm × 58.4 cm 29 in × 23 in	Amon Carter Museum of American Art, Fort Worth, Texas
	Dennis Miller Bunker Painting at Calcot	1888	Portrait	Oil on canvas mounted on masonite	68.6 cm × 64.1 cm 27 in × 25 1/4 in	Terra Museum of American Art, Chicago
	Isabella Stewart Gardner	1888	Portrait	Oil on canvas	190 cm × 81.2 cm 74 13/16 in × 31 15/16 in	Isabella Stewart Gardner Museum, Massachusetts
	Morning Walk	1888	Portrait	Oil on canvas	67.31 cm × 50.16 cm 26 1/2 in × 19 3/4 in	Private collection
	Mrs. Adrian Georg Iselin (Elanora O'Donnell)	1888	Portrait	Oil on canvas	153.7 cm × 93 cm 60 1/2 in × 36 5/8 in	National Gallery of Art, Washington, D.C.
	Mrs. Elliott Fitch Shepard (Margaret Louisa Vanderbilt Shepard)	1888	Portrait	Oil on canvas	214 cm × 122.6 cm 84 1/4 in × 48 1/4 in	San Antonio Museum of Art, Texas
	Mrs. George Gribble (Norah Royds, Julian Royds Gribble's mother)	1888	Portrait	Oil on canvas	226 cm × 119 cm 89 in × 46 3/4 in	Art Museum of Western Virginia
	Gabriel Fauré	c. 1889	Portrait	Oil on canvas	54.5 cm × 49.5 cm 21 7/16 in × 19 1/2 in	Museum of Music, Paris
	Clementina Anstruther-Thomson (granddaughter of John Anstruther-Thomson)	1889	Portrait	Oil on canvas	81.3 cm × 66 cm 32 in × 26 in	Private collection
	Ellen Terry as Lady Macbeth	1889	Portrait	Oil on canvas	220 cm × 110 cm 87 in × 45 in	Tate Britain, London
	Paul Helleu Sketching with His Wife	1889	Portrait	Oil on canvas	66.4 cm × 81.6 cm 26 1/8 in × 32 1/8 in	Brooklyn Museum, New York
	Dorothy Barnard	1889	Portrait	Oil on canvas	70.5 cm × 39.4 cm 27 3/4 in × 15 1/2 in	Fitzwilliam Museum, Cambridge
	Miss Elsie Palmer	c. 1889–90	Portrait	Oil on Canvas	190.8 cm × 114.6 cm 75 1/8 in × 45 1/8 in	Colorado Springs Fine Arts Center, Colorado
	Annie Adams Fields	1890	Portrait	Oil on canvas	76.3 cm × 63.2 cm 30 1/16 in × 24 7/8 in	Boston Athenaeum, Massachusetts
	La Carmencita (Carmen Dauset Moreno)	1890	Portrait	Oil on canvas	229 cm × 138 cm 90 in × 54 1/4 in	Musée d'Orsay, Paris.
	Léon Delafosse	1895	Portrait	Oil on canvas	101.0 cm × 59.5 cm 39 3/4 in × 23 7/16 in	Seattle Art Museum
	George Washington Vanderbilt II	1890	Portrait	Oil on canvas	106.3 cm × 67.3 cm 41 7/8 in × 26 1/2 in}	Biltmore Estate, Asheville, North Carolina
	Edwin Booth	1890	Portrait	Oil on canvas	222.3 cm × 156.8 cm 87 1/2 in × 61 3/4 in	Amon Carter Museum of American Art, Fort Worth, Texas
	Egyptians Raising Water from the Nile	c. 1890-1891	Landscape	Oil on canvas	25 in × 21 in 63 1/2 cm × 53 1/2 cm	Metropolitan Museum of Art, New York
	Egyptian Woman with Earrings	c. 1890-1891	Portrait	Oil on canvas	71 cm × 62 cm 28 in × 24 1/2 in	Metropolitan Museum of Art, New York
	Egyptian Woman	c. 1890-1891	Portrait	Oil on canvas	65 cm × 53 cm 25 1/2 in × 21 in	Metropolitan Museum of Art, New York
	Life Study (Study of an Egyptian Girl)	1891	Portrait	Oil on canvas	190.5 cm × 61 cm 75 in × 24 in	Art Institute of Chicago
	Self-portrait	1892	Portrait	Oil on canvas	53.3 cm × 43.2 cm 21 in × 17 in	National Academy of Design, New York
	John Alfred Parsons Millet, (Francis Davis Millet's son, named after John Singer Sargent and Alfred Parsons)	1892	Portrait	Oil on canvas	92 cm × 61 cm 36 1/4 in × 24 1/8 in	The San Diego Museum of Art, San Diego
	Lady Agnew of Lochnaw	1892	Portrait	Oil on canvas	127 cm × 101 cm 50 in × 40 in	National Gallery of Scotland, Edinburgh
	Mrs. Hugh Hammersley (Violet Hammersley, Wife of Hugh Hammersley)	1892	Portrait	Oil on Canvas	205.7 cm × 115.6 cm 81 in × 45 1/2 in	Metropolitan Museum of Art, New York
	Camprodon, Spain	1892	Landscape	Watercolor	46.7 cm × 31.2 cm 18 3/8 in × 12 5/16 in	National Gallery of Art, Washington D.C.
	Eleonora Duse	c. 1893	Portrait	Oil on canvas	58.4 cm × 48.3 cm 23 in × 19 in	Herta and Paul Amir Collection
	W. Graham Robertson	1894	Portrait	Oil on canvas	230.5 cm × 118.7 cm 90 3/4 in × 46 3/4 in	Tate Britain, London
	Ada Rehan	1894–95	Portrait	Oil on canvas	236 cm × 127 cm 93 in × 50 1/8 in	Metropolitan Museum of Art, New York
	Frederick Law Olmsted	1895	Portrait	Oil on canvas	232.1 cm × 154.3 cm 91 3/8 in × 60 3/4 in	Biltmore Estate, North Carolina
	Mrs. Carl Meyer and her Children	1896	Portrait	Oil on canvas	201.4 cm × 134 cm 79 5/16 in × 52 3/4 in	Tate Britain, London
	Catherine Vlasto	1897	Portrait	Oil on canvas	148.6 cm × 85.4 cm 58 1/2 in × 33 5/8 in	Hirshhorn Museum and Sculpture Garden, Smithsonian Institution, Washington, D.C.
	Mr. and Mrs. I. N. Phelps Stokes	1897	Portrait	Oil on canvas	214 cm × 101 cm 84 1/4 in × 39 3/4 in	Metropolitan Museum of Art, New York
	Asher Wertheimer	1898	Portrait	Oil on canvas	147.3 cm × 97.8 cm 58 in × 38 1/2 in	Tate Britain, London
	Mrs Wertheimer	1898	Portrait	Oil on canvas	147 cm × 95 cm 58 in × 37 1/2 in	New Orleans Museum of Art
	Lisa Colt Curtis (a relative of the Colt firearms family)	1898	Portrait	Oil on canvas	219.3 cm x 104.8 cm 86 5/16 in x 41 1/4 in	Cleveland Museum of Art, Cleveland, Ohio
	Pauline Astor (daughter of William Waldorf Astor)	1898–99	Portrait	Oil on canvas	98 cm × 50 cm 38 1/2 in × 19 1/2 in	The William Morris Collection, on loan to The Huntington Library, Art Collections, and Botanical Gardens in San Marino, California
	Mrs. Joshua Montgomery Sears (Sarah Choate Sears)	1899	Portrait	Oil on canvas	147.6 cm × 96.8 cm 58 1/8 in × 38 1/8 in	Museum of Fine Arts, Houston
	The Wyndham Sisters: Lady Elcho, Mrs. Adeane, and Mrs. Tennant	1899	Portrait	Oil on canvas	292 cm × 214 cm 115 in × 84 1/8 in	Metropolitan Museum of Art, New York
	An Interior in Venice	1899	Portrait	Oil on canvas	65 cm × 81 cm 25 1/2 in × 31 3/4 in	Royal Academy of Arts, London
	The Sitwell Family	1900	Portrait	Oil on canvas	170 cm × 193 cm 67 in × 76 in	Private collection
	John Ridgeley Carter	1901	Portrait	Oil on canvas	85.1 cm × 67.3 cm 33 1/2 in × 26 1/2 in	Private collection
	Alfred, Son of Asher Wertheimer	1901	Portrait	Oil on canvas	163 cm × 115 cm 64 in × 45 1/2 in	Tate Britain, London
	Ena and Betty, Daughters of Asher and Mrs Wertheimer	1901	Portrait	Oil on canvas	185.4 cm × 130.8 cm 73 in × 51 1/2 in	Tate Britain, London
	The Acheson Sisters	1902	Portrait	Oil on canvas	169.2 × 198.1	Chatsworth House
	Essie, Ruby and Ferdinand, Children of Asher Wertheimer	1902	Portrait	Oil on canvas	161.3 cm × 193.7 cm 63 1/2 in × 76 1/4 in	Tate Britain, London
	Portrait of Mrs Leopold Hirsch (Matilda Seligman)	1902	Portrait	Oil on canvas	145 cm × 90 cm 57 in × 35 1/2 in	Tate Britain, London
	Alice Wernher (Alice Sedgwick Mankiewicz, wife of Julius Wernher)	1902	Portrait	Oil on canvas		
	George Frederick McCorquodale	1902	Portrait	Oil on canvas	148 x 96.5cm	Raclin Murphy Museum of Art
	Lady Evelyn Cavendish	1902	Portrait	Oil on canvas	147.5 cm × 91.5 cm 58 1/16 in × 36 in	Chatsworth House, North Derbyshire.
	Lord Ribblesdale	1902	Portrait	Oil on canvas	258.5 cm × 143.5 cm 101 3/4 in × 56 1/2 in	National Gallery, London
	Leonard Wood, Maverick in the Making	1903	Portrait	Oil on canvas	76.5 cm × 63.8 cm 30 1/8 in × 25 1/8 in	National Portrait Gallery (United States), Washington D.C.
	Mrs. Fiske Warren (Gretchen Osgood) and Her Daughter Rachel	1903	Portrait	Oil on canvas	152.4 cm × 102.5 cm 60 in × 40.37 in	Museum of Fine Arts, Boston
	Official White House portrait of Theodore Roosevelt	1903	Portrait	Oil on canvas	147.6 cm × 101.6 cm 58 1/8 in × 40 in	White House Art Collection, Washington, D.C.
	Marionettes	1903	Portrait	Oil on canvas	73.7 cm × 53 cm 29 in × 20 7/8 in	Private collection
	Portrait of Millicent, Duchess of Sutherland	1904	Portrait	Oil on canvas	254 cm × 146 cm 100 in × 57 1/2 in	Thyssen-Bornemisza Museum, Madrid
	Padre Sebastiano	1904	Portrait	Oil on canvas	56.5 cm × 71.1 cm 22 1/4 in × 28 in	Metropolitan Museum of Art, New York
	Frank Swettenham, 8th King of Arms of the Order of St Michael and St George	1904	Portrait	Oil on canvas	258 cm × 142.5 cm 101 9/16 in × 56 1/8 in	Singapore History Gallery, National Museum of Singapore
	Charles Stewart, Sixth Marquess of Londonderry, Carrying the Great Sword of State at the Coronation of King Edward VII, August, 1902, and Mr. W. C. Beaumont, His Page on That Occasion	1904	Portrait	Oil on canvas	287 cm × 195.6 cm 113 in × 77 in	Museum of Fine Arts, Boston
	Mrs Wertheimer (Flora Wertheimer)	1904	Portrait	Oil on canvas	163.2 cm × 107.9 cm 64 1/4 in × 42 1/2 in	Tate Britain, London
	Helen Vincent, Viscountess d'Abernon	1904	Portrait	Oil on canvas	158.8 cm × 108 cm 62 1/2 in × 42 1/2 in	Birmingham Museum of Art, Alabama
	An Artist in His Studio (Ambrogio Raffaele)	1904	Portrait	Oil on canvas	56 cm × 72 cm 22 1/16 in × 28 3/8 in	Museum of Fine Arts, Boston
	Mrs. J.P. Morgan, Jr.	c. 1904-1906	Portrait	Oil on canvas	147 cm × 66 cm 58 in × 26 in	The Morgan Library & Museum, New York
	Man Reading (Nicola d’Inverno)	c. 1904-1908	Portrait	Oil on canvas	64 cm × 57 cm 25 1/4 in × 22 1/4 in	Reading Public Museum, Pennsylvania
	The 9th Duke and Duchess of Marlborough and their two sons (Charles, Consuelo, and their sons John, and Ivor Spencer-Churchill)	1905	Portrait	Oil on canvas	332.7 cm × 238.8 cm 131 in × 94 in	Collection of the Duke of Marlborough, Blenheim Palace, Oxfordshire
	Sybil Frances Grey (later Lady Eden and mother of Anthony Eden)	1905	Portrait	Oil on canvas	109.2 cm × 87.6 cm 43 in × 34 1/2 in	National Portrait Gallery (United States), Washington D.C.
	In a Levantine Port	c. 1905-1906	Portrait	Watercolor	30.6 cm × 46 cm 12 1/16 in × 18 1/8 in	Brooklyn Museum, New York
	Bedouins	c. 1905-1906	Portrait	Watercolor	45.7 cm × 30.5 cm 18 in × 12 in	Brooklyn Museum, New York
	Dolce far niente	c. 1905-1909	Landscape	Oil on canvas	41.3 cm × 71.7 cm 16 1/4 in × 28 1/4 in	Brooklyn Museum, New York
	Frederick Sleigh Roberts, 1st Earl Roberts	1906	Portrait	Oil on canvas	163.8 cm × 105 cm 64 1/2 in × 41 5/16 in	National Portrait Gallery, London
	Lady Eden	1906	Portrait	Oil on canvas	110.6 cm × 86.5 cm 43 9/16 in × 34 1/16 in	Philadelphia Museum of Art, Philadelphia
	Self-Portrait	1906	Portrait	Oil on canvas	70 cm × 53 cm 27 1/2 in × 21 in	Uffizi Gallery, Florence
	The Four Doctors	1906	Portrait	Oil on canvas		William H. Welch Medical Library
	Aaron Augustus Healy	1907	Portrait	Oil on canvas	85.6 cm × 63 cm 33 1/2 in × 25 in	Brooklyn Museum, New York
	The Chess Game	1907	Landscape	Oil on canvas	69.9 cm × 55.3 cm 27 1/2 in × 21 3/4 in	Private collection
	The Fountain, Villa Torlonia, Frascati, Italy	1907	Landscape	Oil on canvas	71.4 cm × 56.5 cm 28 1/8 in × 22 1/4 in	Art Institute of Chicago
	Lady Speyer (Leonora Speyer)	1907	Portrait	Oil on canvas	147 cm × 97 cm 58 in × 38 in	Private collection
	Lady Sassoon	1907	Portrait	Oil on canvas	157.5 cm × 104.1 cm 62 in × 41 in	Private collection
	Cashmere	1908	Portrait	Oil on canvas	71.1 cm × 109.2 cm 28 in × 43 in	Private collection
	Gourds	1908	Landscape	Watercolor	35.1 cm × 50.0 cm 13 13/16 in × 19 11/16 in	Brooklyn Museum, New York
	Black Brook	1908	Landscape	Oil on canvas	55.2 cm × 69.8 cm 21 3/4 in × 27 1/2 in	Tate Britain, London
	Almina, Daughter of Asher Wertheimer	1908	Portrait	Oil on canvas	134 cm × 101 cm 53 in × 40 in	Tate Britain, London
	The Moraine	1908	Landscape	Oil on canvas	55.88 cm × 69.85 cm 22 in × 27 1/2 in	Private collection
	The Hermit (Il solitario)	1908	Landscape	Oil on canvas	96 cm × 96 cm 37.7 in × 37.9 in	Metropolitan Museum of Art, New York
	Nancy Langhorne, Viscountess Astor	c. 1908-1909	Portrait	Oil on canvas	149.9 cm × 99 cm 59 in × 39 in	Cliveden, Buckinghamshire (National Trust)
	Artist in the Simplon	c. 1909	Landscape	Watercolor	40.5 cm × 53.2 cm 15 15/16 in × 20 15/16 in	Fogg Museum of Art
	Albanian Olive Gatherers	1909	Landscape	Oil on canvas	96 x 115.1	Manchester Art Gallery
	Vespers	c. 1909	Landscape	Oil on canvas	71 × 91	Walker Art Gallery, Liverpool
	Olive Grove	1910	Landscape	Oil on canvas	56.1 cm × 72.9 cm 22 1/16 in × 28 11/16 in	Indianapolis Museum of Art
	The Garden Wall	1910	Landscape	Watercolor	40 cm × 52.1 cm 15 3/4 in × 20 1/2 in	Museum of Fine Arts, Boston
	Villa di Marlia, Lucca	1910	Landscape	Watercolor	40.5 cm × 53.2 cm 15 15/16 in × 20 15/16 in	Museum of Fine Arts, Boston
	Nonchaloir (Repose)	1911	Portrait	Oil on canvas	63.8 cm × 76.2 cm 25 1/8 in × 30 in	National Gallery of Art, Washington, D.C.
	Simplon Pass	1911	Landscape	Oil on canvas	71.8 cm × 92.6 cm 28 1/4 in × 36 7/16 in	National Gallery of Art, Washington, D.C.
	Granada: Sunspots	1912	Landscape	Oil on canvas	69.9 cm × 54.6 cm 27 1/2 in × 21 1/2 in	Smithsonian American Art Museum, Washington, D.C.
	Hospital at Granada	1912	Landscape	Oil on canvas	56.2 cm × 71.5 cm 22 1/8 in × 28 1/8 in	National Gallery of Victoria, Melbourne
	Escutcheon of Charles V of Spain	1912	Landscape	Watercolor	30.5 cm × 45.7 cm 12 in × 18 in	Metropolitan Museum of Art, New York
	Portrait of Henry James	1913	Portrait	Oil on canvas	85.1 cm × 67.3 cm 33 1/2 in × 26 1/2 in	National Portrait Gallery, London
	George Curzon, 1st Marquess Curzon of Kedleston	1914	Portrait	Oíl on canvas	104.1 cm × 81.3 cm 41 in × 32 in	National Portrait Gallery, London
	Karer See	1914	Landscape	Watercolor	40.6 cm × 52.7 cm 16 in × 20.75 in	Private collection
	Tyrolese Interior	1915	Portrait	Oil on canvas	71.4 cm × 56.0 cm 28 1/8 in × 22 1/16 in	Metropolitan Museum of Art, New York
	Lake O'Hara	1916	Landscape	Oil on canvas	97.5 cm × 116.2 cm 38 3/8 in × 45 3/4 in	Fogg Museum of Art
	James Deering	1917	Portrait	Oil on canvas	72.4 cm × 53.3 cm 28 1/2 in × 21 in	Chicago Art Institute
	Portrait of Woodrow Wilson	1917	Portrait	oil on canvas	153 cm × 109 cm 60 1/4 in × 42 15/16 in	National Gallery of Ireland
	John D. Rockefeller	1917	Portrait	Oil on canvas	147.3 cm × 114.3 cm 58 in × 45 in	Senator and Mrs. John D. Rockefeller IV
	Nude Study of Thomas E. McKeller	c. 1917-1920	Portrait	Oil on canvas	125.73 cm × 84.45 cm 49 1/2 in × 33 1/4 in	Museum of Fine Arts, Boston
	Tommies Bathing	1918	Portrait	Watercolor	34.6 cm × 53.2 cm 13 5/8 in × 20 15/16 in	Metropolitan Museum of Art, New York
	Gassed	1919	Landscape	Oil on canvas	231 cm × 611.1 cm 91 in × 240 1/2 in	Imperial War Museum, London
	Synagogue	1919	Mural	Oil on canvas	240 cm × 160 cm 95 in × 63 in	Boston Public Library
	Atlas and the Hesperides	c. 1922-1925	Mural	Oil on canvas	Diameter: 304.8 cm 120 in	Museum of Fine Arts, Boston
	General Officers of World War I	1922	Portrait	Oil on canvas	299.7 cm × 528.3 cm 118 in × 208 in	National Portrait Gallery, London
	On the Deck of the Yacht Constellation	1924	Landscape	Watercolor		Peabody Essex Museum, Salem, Massachusetts
	Grace Elvina, Marchioness Curzon of Kedleston	1925	Portrait	Oil on canvas	127 cm × 92.7 cm 50 in × 36 1/2 in	Currier Museum of Art, Manchester, New Hampshire
