= The Hermit (Il solitario) =

Painting by John Singer Sargent

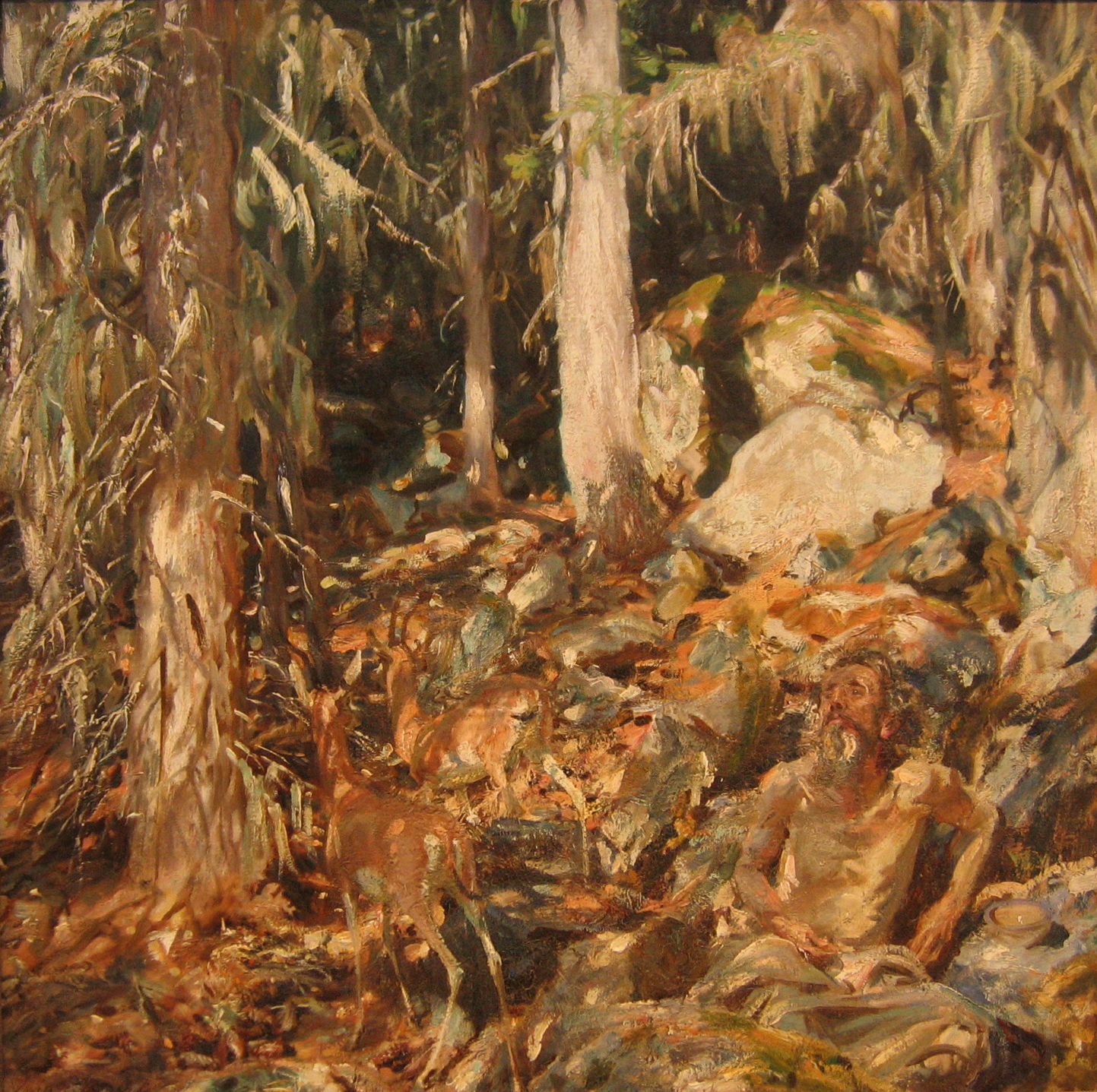
- Artist: John Singer Sargent
- Year: 1908
- Medium: Oil on canvas
- Dimensions: 96 cm × 37.7 cm (38 in × 14.8 in)
- Location: Metropolitan Museum of Art, New York

The Hermit (Il solitario) is a 1908 painting by John Singer Sargent. It is part of the collection of the Metropolitan Museum of Art.

== Description ==
The painting was the result of sketches Sargent made in the Aosta Valley, in the foothills of the Italian Alps. He uses textured brushstrokes to convey the dappled sunlight falling on the forest, the hermit, and two deer. Despite the similarity with depictions of Saint Jerome in the wilderness, Sargent wrote to the director of the Metropolitan, "I wish there were another simple word [other than Hermit] that did not bring with it any Christian association, and that rather suggested quietness and pantheism."

== See also ==
- List of works by John Singer Sargent
