= Mrs. Hugh Hammersley =

Painting by John Singer Sargent

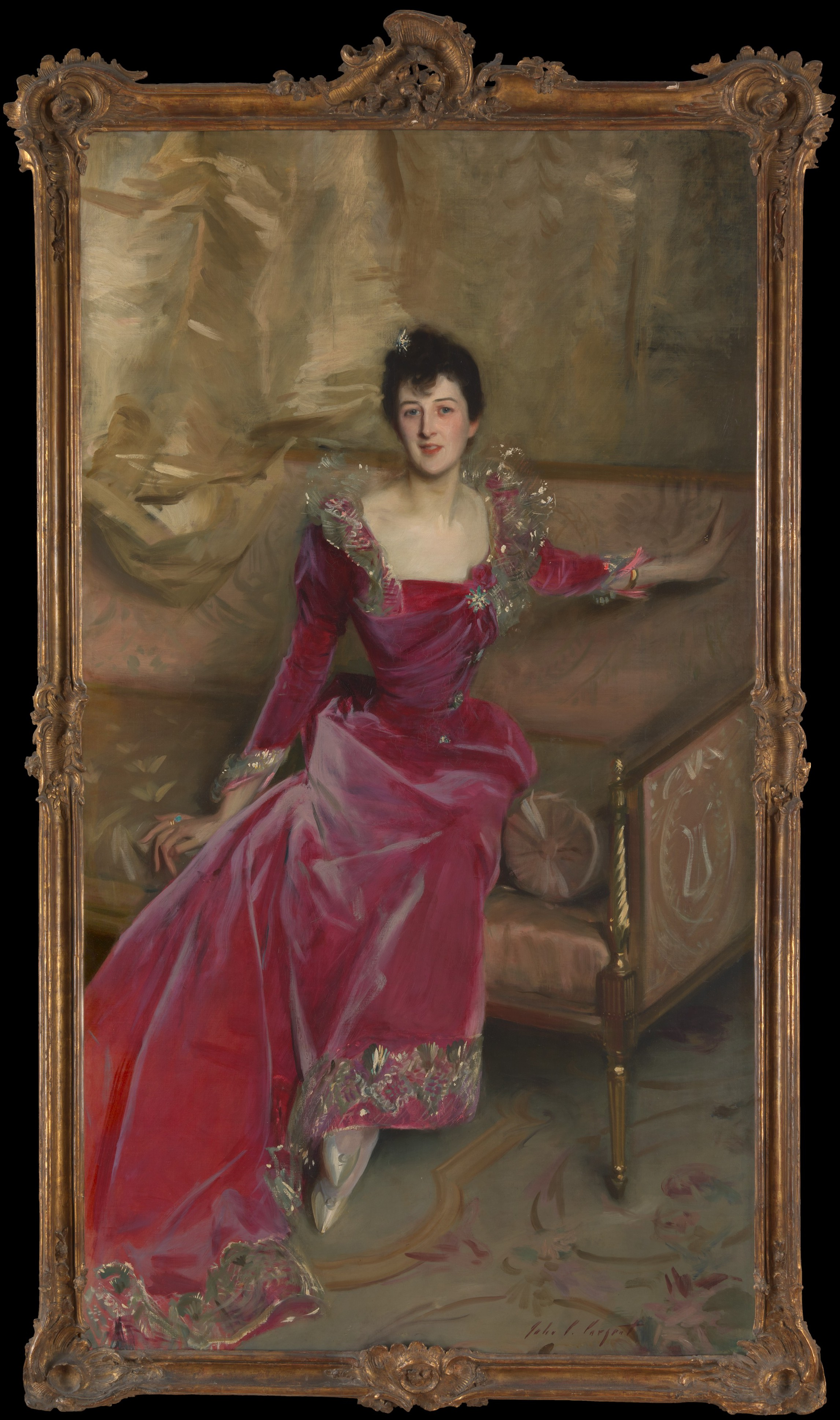
- Artist: John Singer Sargent
- Year: 1892
- Medium: oil on canvas
- Dimensions: 205.7 cm × 115.6 cm (81.0 in × 45.5 in)
- Location: Metropolitan Museum of Art; New York City, New York, United States

Mrs. Hugh Hammersley is an 1892 painting by John Singer Sargent. It is part of the collection of the Metropolitan Museum of Art.

== History ==
The portrait is of Mrs. Hammersley, née Mary Frances Grant (ca. 1863–ca. 1902), who was the wife of a banker and a fashionable London hostess. In the portrait, she is delicately poised on a French sofa. According to the Metropolitan Museum of Art:

"Her willowy form and candid expression suggest Sargent's ability to characterize and flatter simultaneously. Her gold-trimmed silk-velvet dress and the sumptuous setting announce his mastery of varied textures and patterns."

The painting was well reviewed when it appeared at the New Gallery in London in 1893. The reviews it received there, and at the Salon of the Société Nationale des Beaux-Arts in Paris in 1894, appeared to forgive Sargent for his infamous Madame X in 1884. The painting is among the first of Sargent's series of images of glamorous English women that culminated in The Wyndham Sisters: Lady Elcho, Mrs. Adeane, and Mrs. Tennant of 1899. Conservators at the Metropolitan note, "Sargent’s unabashedly modern portrayal of the daring and stylish Mrs. Hammersley is a superb demonstration of the artist’s confidence and skill as well that of his sitter."

=== Provenance ===
After Mrs. Hammersley's death in 1902, her husband kept the painting until 1923, when financial troubles compelled him to sell the work. At the suggestion of Sargent, it was purchased by Charles Deering (1852–1927), an American whose portrait Sargent had painted in Newport, Rhode Island in 1876, and who collected Sargent's works.

The painting is currently owned by the Metropolitan Museum of Art.

== In popular culture ==
The painting makes an appearance in the 2020 Netflix film Rebecca based on the Daphne du Maurier novel.

== See also ==
- List of works by John Singer Sargent
