= Portrait of Fanny Watts =

Painting by John Singer Sargent

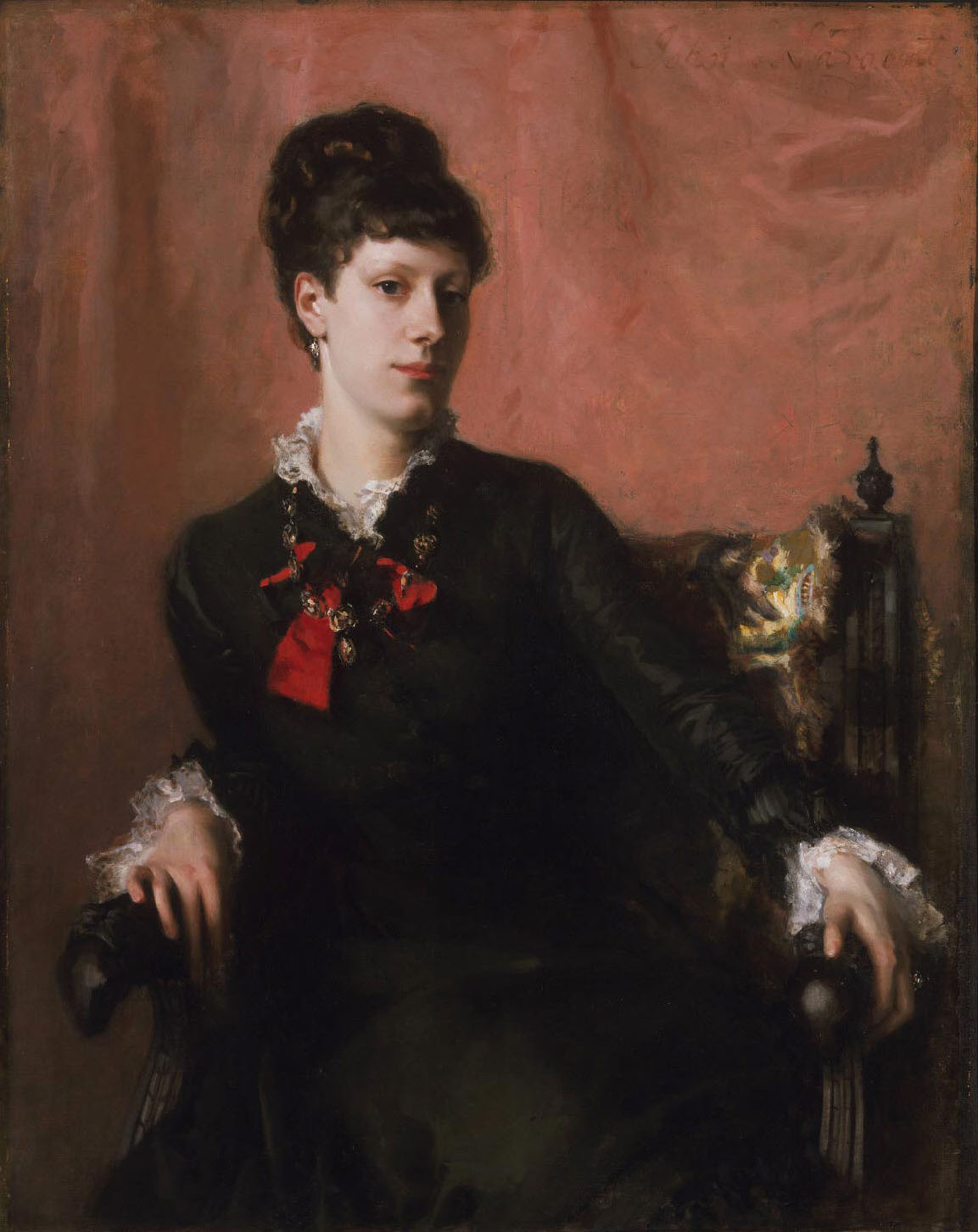
- Artist: John Singer Sargent
- Year: 1877
- Type: Oil on canvas, portrait painting
- Dimensions: 105.9 cm × 81.3 cm (41.7 in × 32.0 in)
- Location: Philadelphia Museum of Art, Pennsylvania

Portrait of Fanny Watts or Portrait of Frances Sherborne Ridley Watts is an 1877 portrait painting by the American artist John Singer Sargent. It depicts Fanny Watts a fellow American expatriate and a childhood family friend. Both their families had moved to Europe and Sargent himself was born in Italy. He began the work at the village of Saint Enogat on the coast of Brittany. Two years younger than the twenty one year Sargent, she was at one point thought a possible wife although his mother moved to block this. Sargent depicts her in the style of a Venetian noblewoman, drawing on the influence of Tintoretto.

The artist produced the work while he was studying in Paris at the atelier of Carolus-Duran. He submitted the work to the Salon of 1877 in Paris, his debut at the prestigious exhibition. The following year it featured as part of the art exhibition of the large Exposition Universelle. Today the painting is in the collection of the Philadelphia Museum of Art, which acquired it in 1962.

== See also ==
- List of works by John Singer Sargent

== Bibliography ==
- Adelson, Warren. Sargent's Venice. Yale University Press, 2006.
- Fisher, Paul. The Grand Affair: John Singer Sargent in His World. Picador, 2023.
- Ormond, Richard. Sargent and the Sea. Yale University Press, 2009.
