= Egyptians Raising Water from the Nile =

Painting by John Singer Sargent

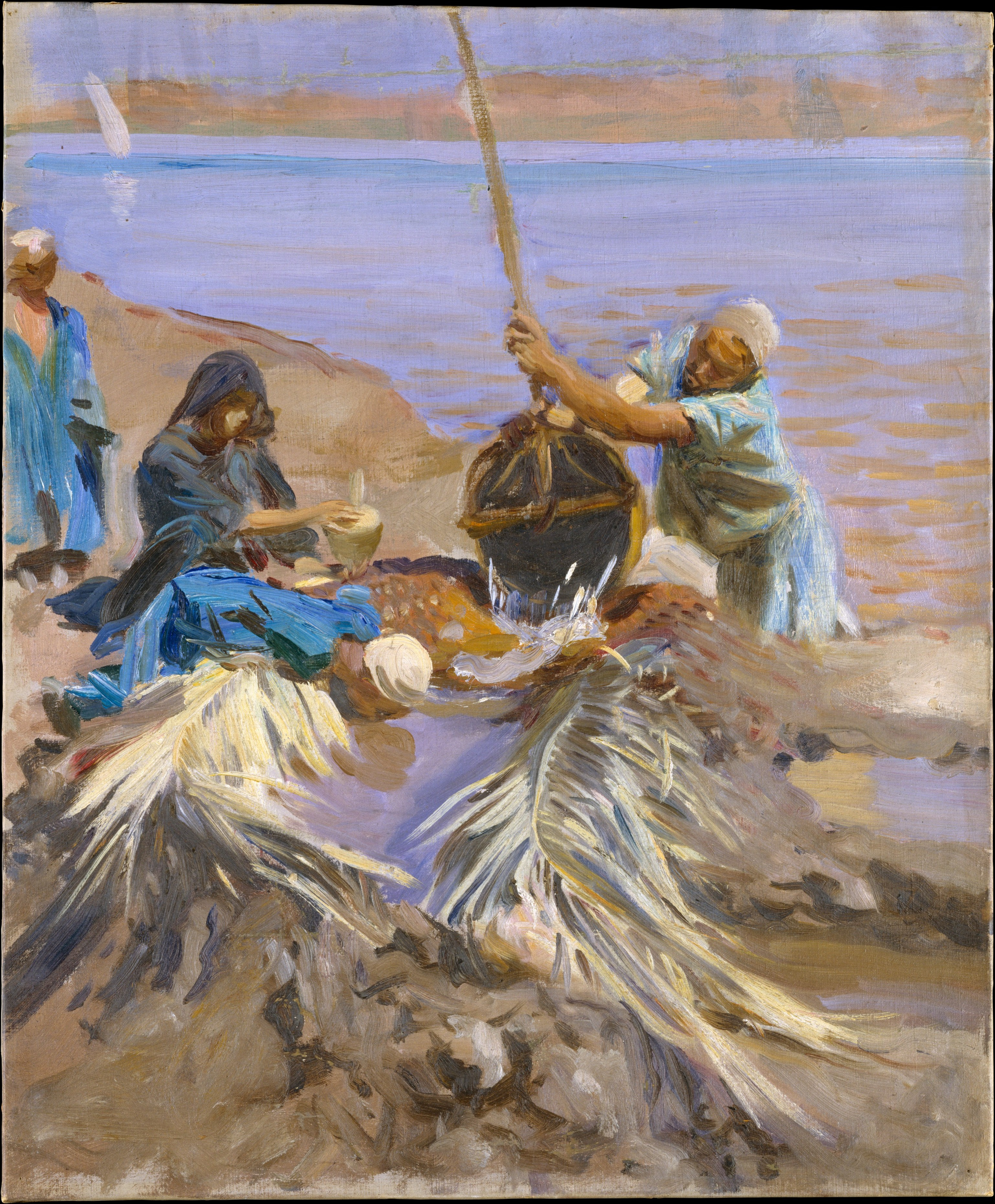
- Artist: John Singer Sargent
- Year: 1890-1891
- Medium: oil on canvas
- Dimensions: 63.5 cm × 53.3 cm (25.0 in × 21.0 in)
- Location: Metropolitan Museum of Art; New York

Egyptians Raising Water from the Nile is an 1890–1891 painting by John Singer Sargent. It is part of the collection of the Metropolitan Museum of Art, New York City, United States.

Sargent made several trips to Egypt, Greece and Turkey as part of a project commissioned by the Boston Public Library to explore the origin of Western religion through art. Whilst in Egypt, he created this canvas in 1890–91, depicting a group of locals drinking or collecting water from the Nile which had been raised to the bank by a shaduf.

== See also ==
- 1891 in art
- List of works by John Singer Sargent
