= Egyptian Woman with Earrings =

Painting by John Singer Sargent

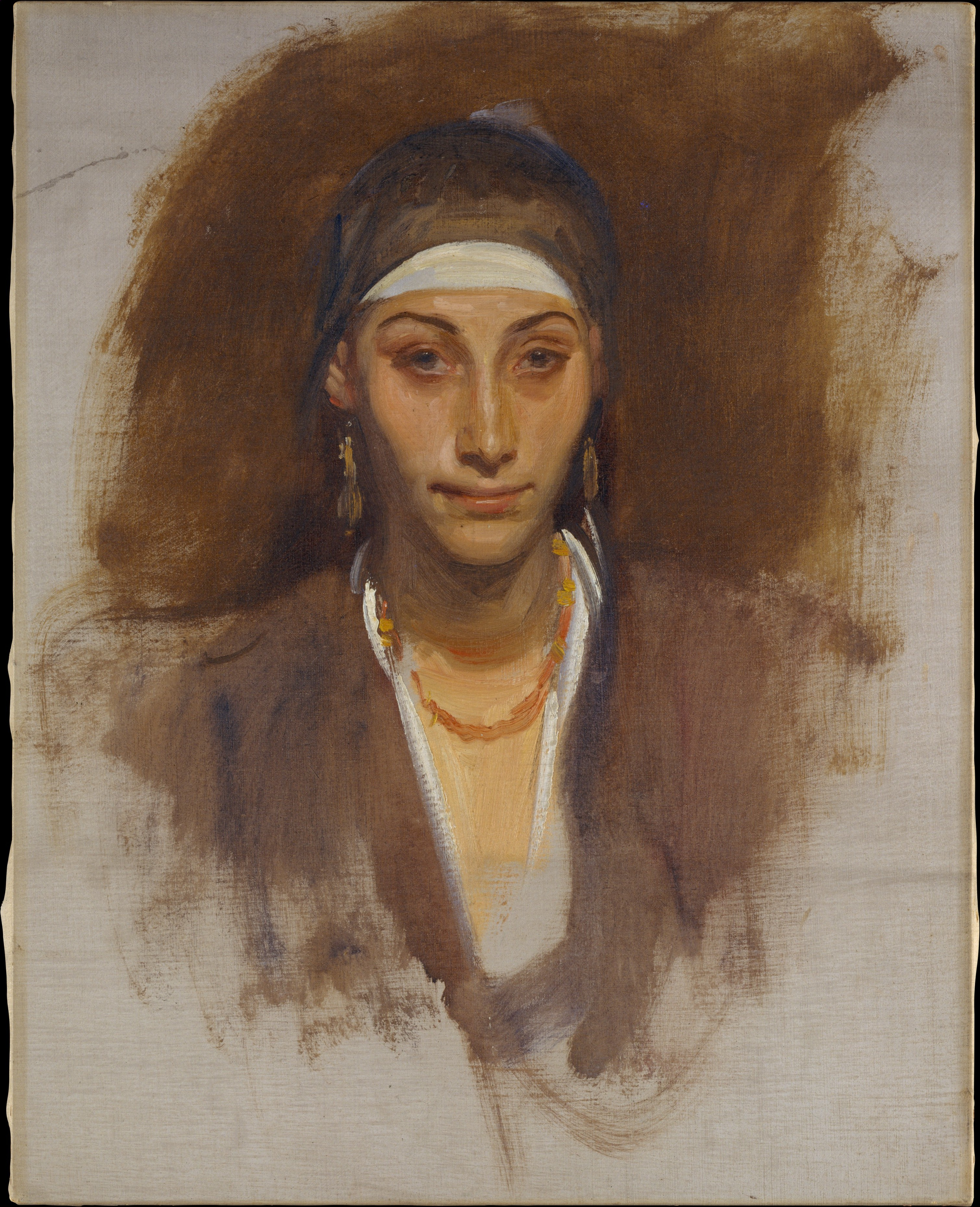
- Artist: John Singer Sargent
- Year: 1890–91
- Medium: Oil on canvas
- Dimensions: 53.3 cm × 64.1 cm (21.0 in × 25.2 in)
- Location: Metropolitan Museum of Art; New York
- Accession: 50.130.22

Egyptian Woman with Earrings is a late 19th-century painting by American artist John Singer Sargent. Done in oil on canvas, the work portrays an Egyptian woman. The painting is in the collection of the Metropolitan Museum of Art in New York.

Sargent made a trip to Egypt, Greece and Turkey as part of a project to explore the origin of Western religion through art. This picture and a companion one, Egyptian Woman, also in the Met's collection, were amongst his output on the trip.

The work is on view at the Metropolitan Museum's Gallery 774.

== See also ==
- List of works by John Singer Sargent
