= Tyrolese Interior =

Painting by John Singer Sargent

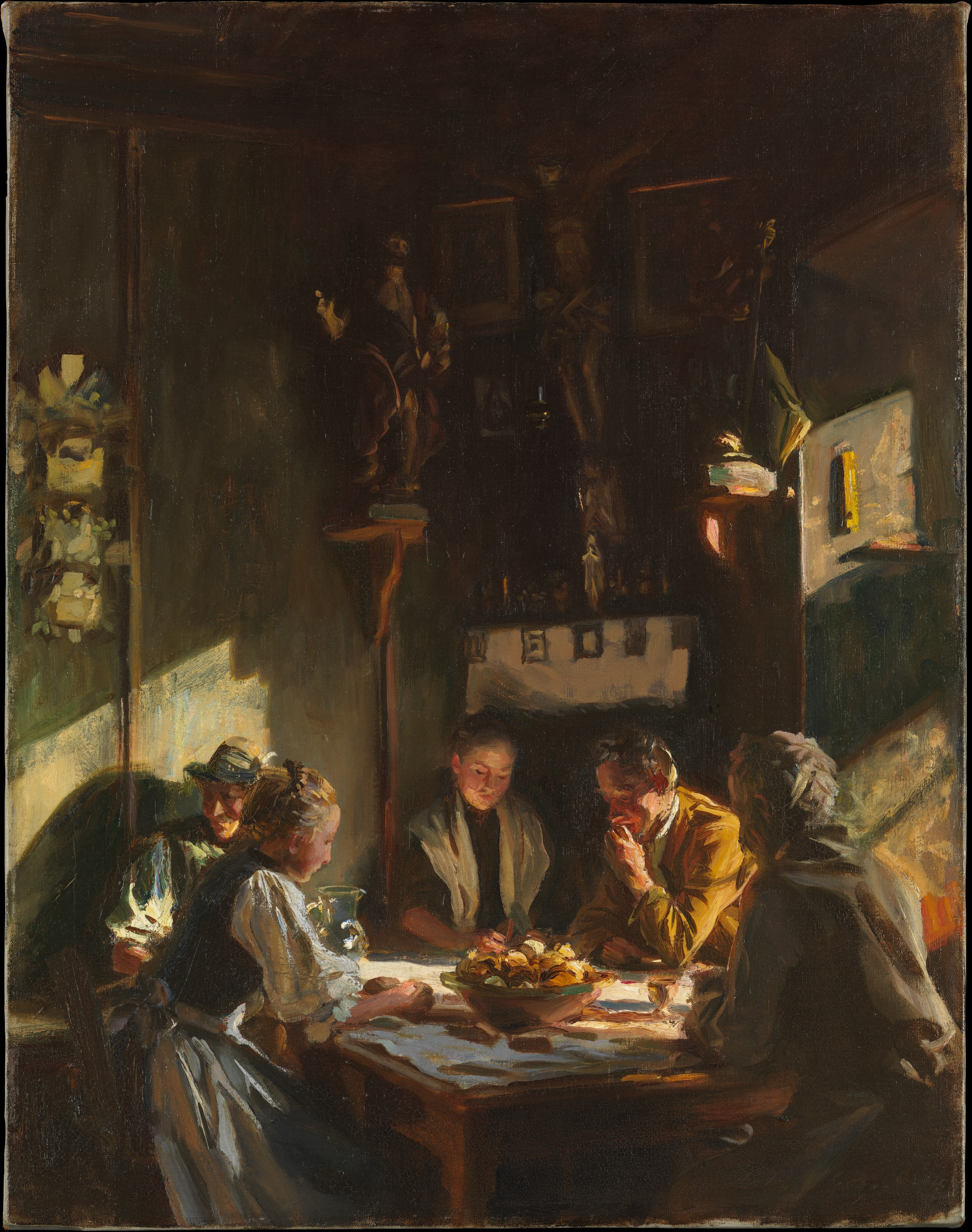
- Artist: John Singer Sargent
- Year: 1914
- Medium: Oil on Canvas
- Dimensions: 71.4 cm × 56 cm (28.1 in × 22 in)
- Location: Metropolitan Museum of Art; New York City
- Accession: 15.142.1

Tyrolese Interior is a 1915 painting by John Singer Sargent. It is part of the collection of the Metropolitan Museum of Art.

It was probably painted in Sankt Lorenzen in the Tyrol in an old castle converted to a farmhouse. It depicts a peasant family at their midday meal against a background filled with religious objects.

The work is on view in the Metropolitan Museum's Gallery 770.

== See also ==
- List of works by John Singer Sargent
