= Arsène Vigeant =

French fencing master and historian

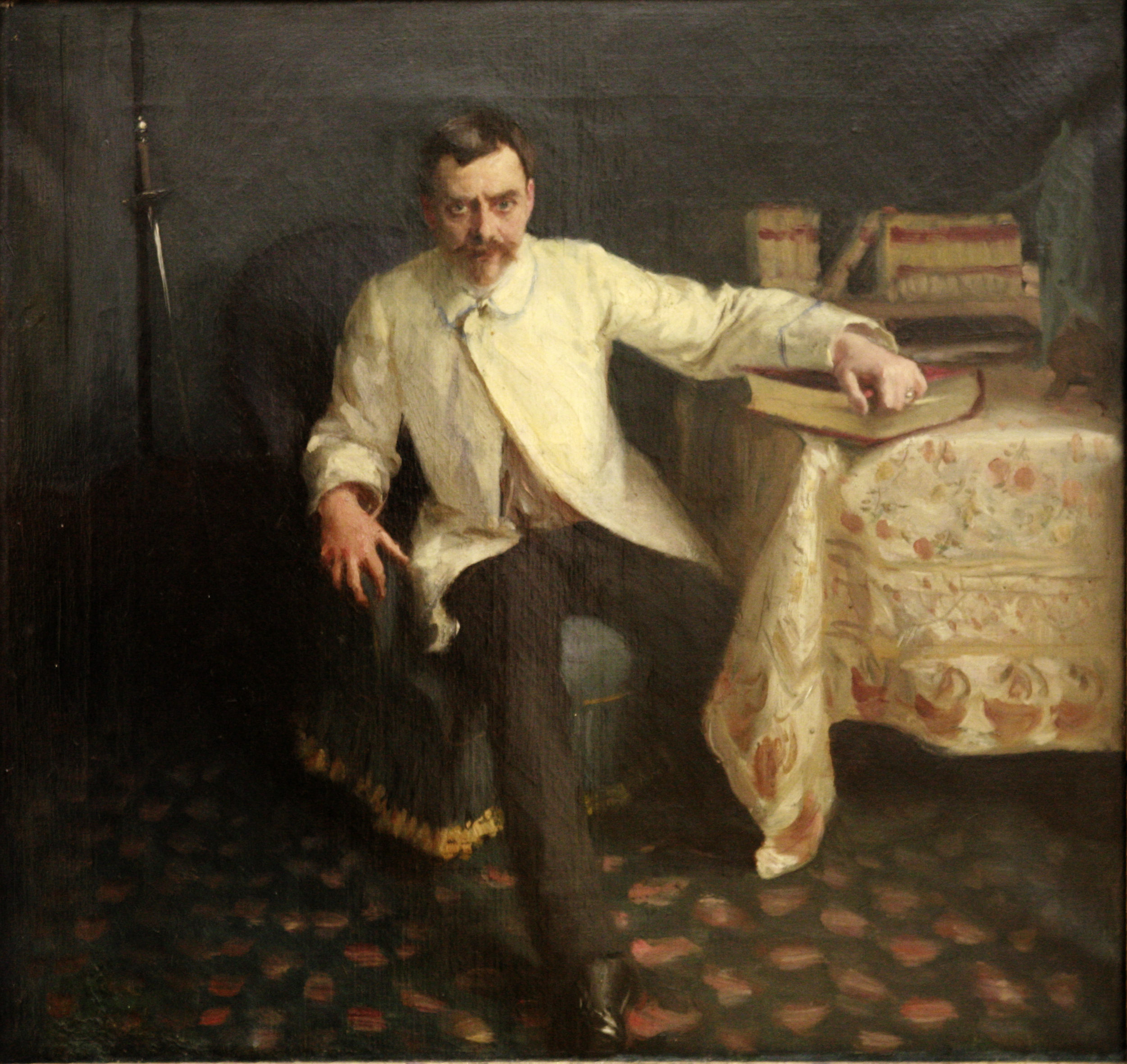
John Singer Sargent, Arsène Vigeant, 1885, oil on canvas, Musées de Metz

Arsène Vigeant (6 January 1844 - April 1916) was a French maître d'armes (fencing master) and historian of fencing.

== Early life ==
Vigeant was born in Metz.

== Career ==
Vigeant was Napoleon III's fencing instructor, and taught fencing in Paris, including at the Cercle de l’Union artistique club. His students included the portraitist Carolus-Duran.

Vigeant was the instructor at the Salle d'Armes du Figaro, which was established in the offices of the Parisian newspaper Le Figaro with the "keen permission" of Le Figaro's owner, Hippolyte de Villemessant. The Salle was patronised by the newspaper's journalists, editors, clerks, and cashiers "especially to permit a particularly healthy and hygienic exercise after their daily, and sometimes very difficult intellectual work", and "became a popular destination for traveling amateurs and masters".

In 1885, Vigeant quit his position at the Cercle de l’Union artistique following a disagreement with another prominent fencing master, Louis Mérignac, and he became a fencing historian and collector.

== Portrait by John Singer Sargent ==
Vigeant was friends with American expatriate society portraitist John Singer Sargent, who he met through Carolus-Duran (with whom Sargent studied painting). In 1885, Sargent painted Vigeant; the portrait has been interpreted as symbolic of Vigeant's transition from fencing master to scholar, with Vigeant depicted at a table with his fingers marking a page in a large book and his foil relegated to the back corner of the composition. By his will made in 1916, Vigeant bequeathed the portrait "to the museum of Metz, my hometown", but on condition that it "became French again". In 1920, the painting entered the collection of the Museums of Metz.

== Works by Vigeant ==
- La bibliographie de l'escrime ancienne et moderne (Paris, impr. de Motteroz, 1882) - full text in French here
- Un maître d'armes sous la Restauration: petit essai historique (Paris, impr. de Motteroz, 1883) - full text in French here
- L'Almanach de l'escrime (Paris, Maison Quantin, 1889) - full text in French here
