= Ambrogio Raffaele =

Italian painter (1845–1928)

Ambrogio Raffaele or Raffele (1845–1928) was an Italian painter.

He was born in Vigevano. He studied under Antonio Fontanesi and Andrea Gastaldi at the Accademia Albertina in Turin, and was a colleague of Marco Calderini. He moved back to Vigevano late in life. He painted both genre and landscapes, in oil and water-color. In 1880 at Turin, he exhibited: Bacia, sole immortale, bacia il tuo figlio. At Milan, in 1881, he had a landscape depicting Un tramonto di sole, and at Rome, in 1833, Lettrice distratta. Among his other works were La finestra dirimpetto; Piazza Pia a Roma; Al Colosseo; and Sera; Rome fuori Porta San Paolo and Passeggiata in montagna were watercolors displayed at the 1887 Exhibition in Venice. Singer Sargent painted a portrait of the artist with his painter's kit and chair, sitting atop a hillside in front of an alpine landscape. This underscores Raffaele's technique to paint his landscapes outdoors.
