= Synagogue (John Singer Sargent) =

Painting by John Singer Sargent

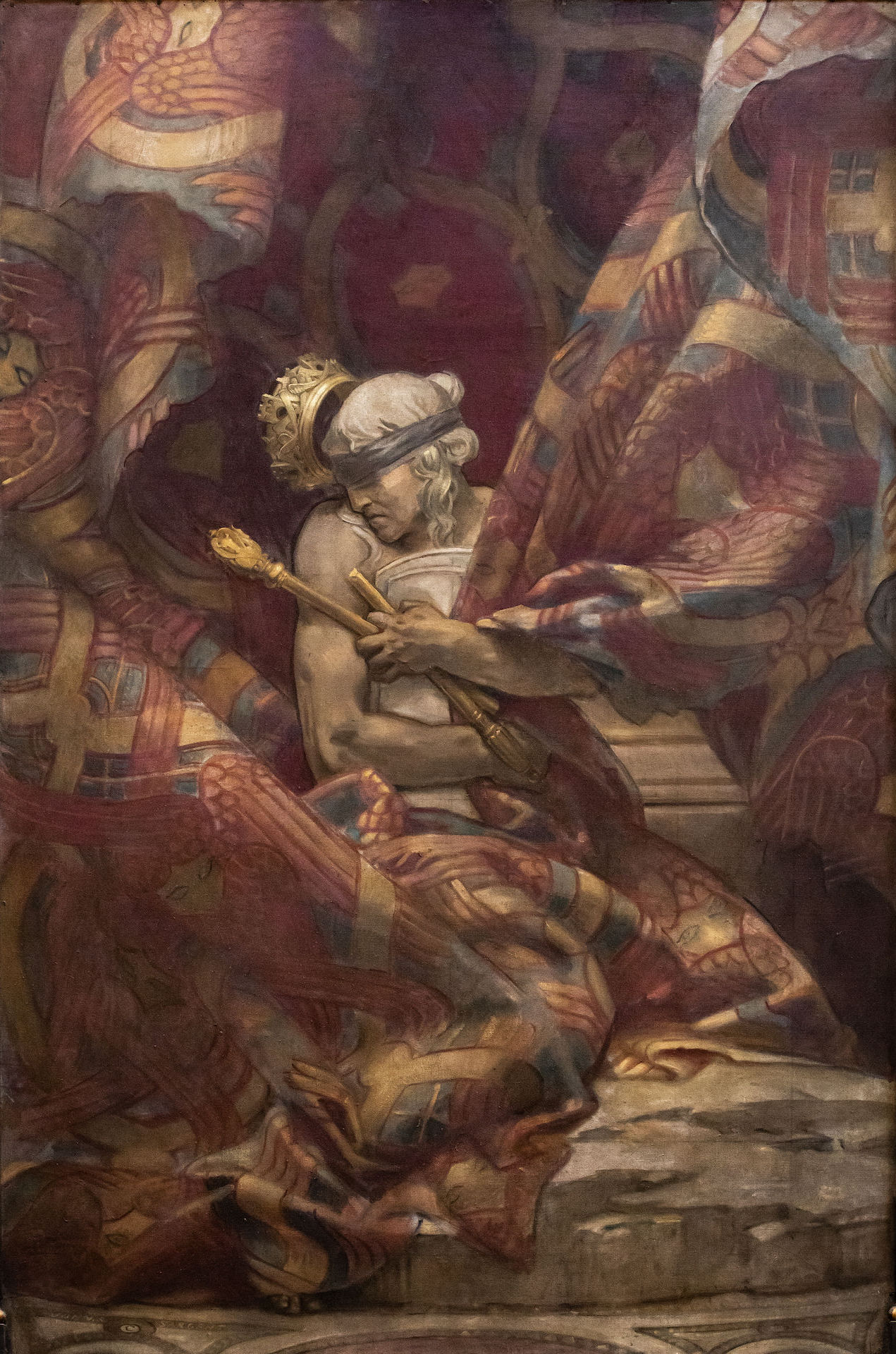
- Artist: John Singer Sargent
- Year: 1919

Synagogue is an allegorical mural by John Singer Sargent (1856-1925) in the Boston Public Library. It is part of Sargent's larger Triumph of Religion mural cycle in the Boston Central Library at Copley Square. Synagogue was unveiled in 1919, and it sparked immediate controversy. The cowering and feeble personification of the Synagogue stood in contrast with Sargent's glorified depiction of the Church in the mural cycle, and members of the Jewish community observed that the series delivered an implicit message of Jewish decline and Christian triumph. Sargent was reluctant to respond publicly to criticism of the work, but privately wrote in 1919, "I am in hot water with the Jews, who resent my ‘Synagogue,’ and want to have it removed– and tomorrow a ‘prominent’ member of the Jewish colony is coming to bully me about it and ask me to explain myself. I can only refer him to Rheims, Notre Dame, Strasbourg and other Cathedrals, and dwell at length about the good old times." Responding to charges that the work was antisemitic, the Massachusetts legislature passed a bill ordering the removal of the mural in 1922, but the law was soon repealed, and the work has remained in place.

== Background: Triumph of Religion ==
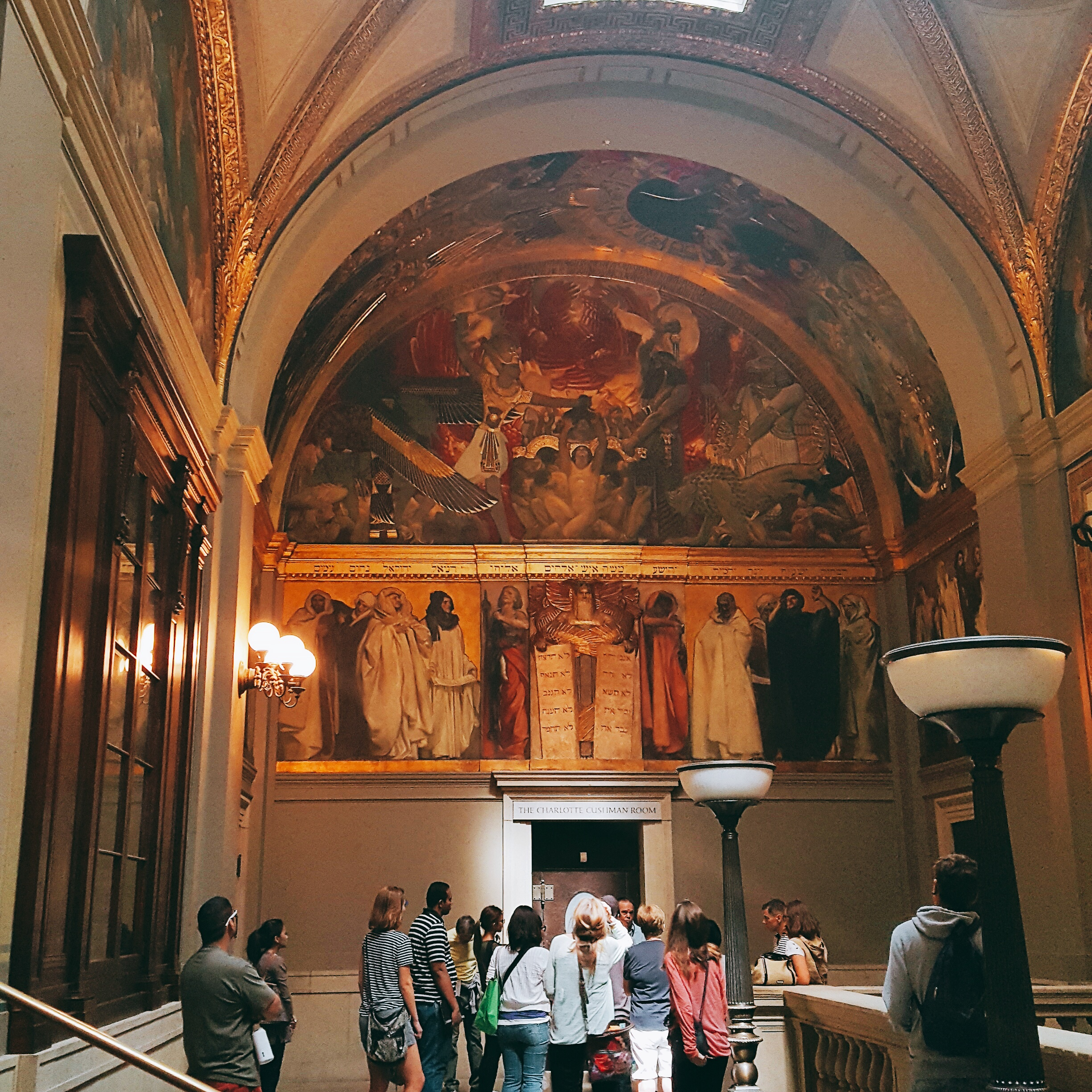
Part of the Triumph of Religion cycle in the Boston Central Library

The Triumph of Religion is a commissioned work by Sargent at the Boston Public Library. In official correspondence with the library, Sargent described it as "Triumph of Religion—a mural decoration illustrating certain stages of Jewish and Christian religious history." Designed and painted in London, the cycle is divided into 17 works that were transferred to Boston in installments. Sargent began sketching the murals in 1891, and the cycle remained unfinished at the time of his death in 1925.

Synagogue and its counterpart, Church, appear on the East wall, on either side of a space reserved for a depiction of Jesus giving the Sermon on the Mount, which was never finished.

== Iconography ==
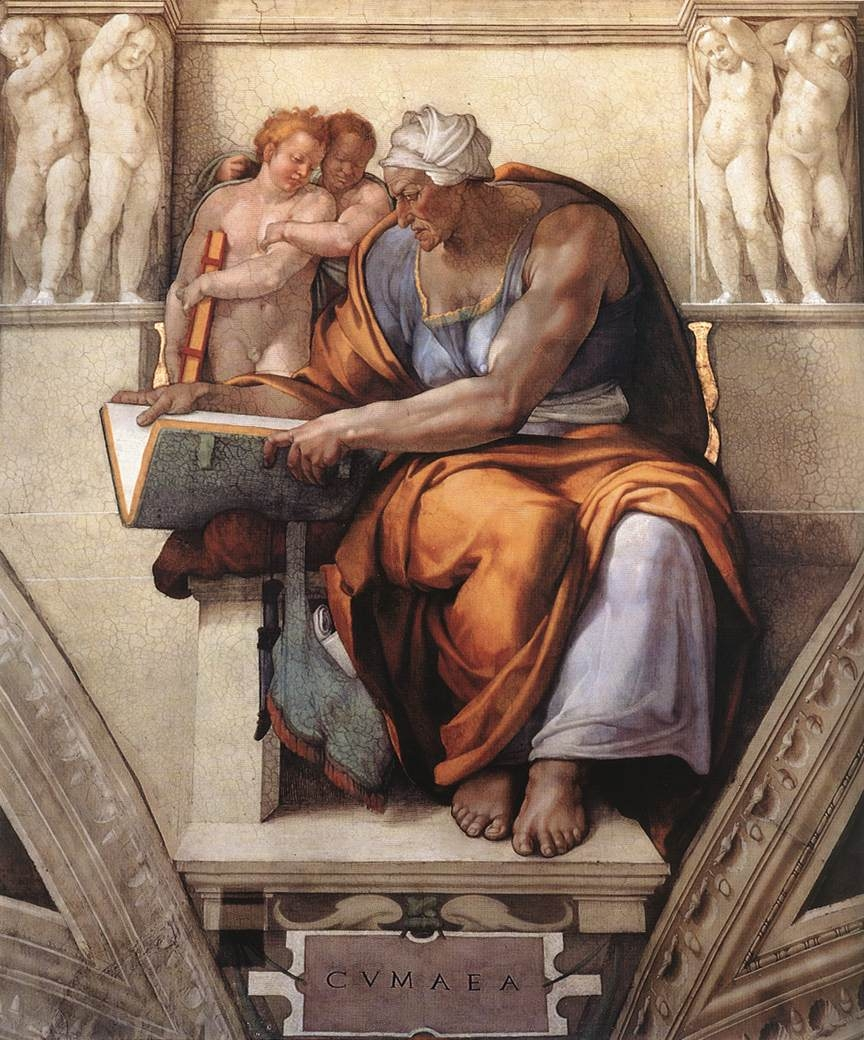
Michelangelo's Cumaean Sibyl, Sistine Chapel

Scholars have identified many themes and influences in the larger mural cycle. Sally M. Promey identifies three key themes: individualism and subjectivity overcoming law and doctrine; a reaction to World War I; and concealment and revelation. She also notes the visual similarity between Synagogue and the Cumaean Sibyl in Michaelangelo’s Sistine Chapel. Sargent also may have been influenced by the writing of Ernest Renan.

== Antisemitism controversy ==
Even before Synagogue was unveiled to the public, there were already fears about Sargent's handling of the religious subject matter. Promey writes that prior to the mural’s installment, Boston Herald critic Frederick William Coburn opined that "in the interest of racial and religious amenity in this community, one hopes that Mr. Sargent has avoided the old middle-age bigotry in working out this perilous theme, as no doubt he has done." Given the antisemitism and immigration restriction of the 1920's, Sargent’s treatment of religion had the potential to be extremely divisive. Indeed, after the painting was revealed, many viewers did find it offensive, and there were numerous attempts to remove it in subsequent years.

=== Ideological criticisms ===
Critics of the painting objected to the representation of the Synagogue as a huddled woman wearing a blindfold, especially next to the representation of the Christian church, a pietà. Many saw the painting as representing a triumph of Christianity, rather than one of religion. Leo Franklin, the President of Reform Judaism’s Central Conference found that the painting presented "Judaism as a broken faith, as a faith without a future," and therefore should not be placed in a public library. This depiction of Judaism, in addition to being offensive, was also historically inaccurate. Massachusetts State Representative Coleman Silbert wrote that the representation “represent[ed] Judaism as downfallen or dead, which is far from the truth... it is against the broad spirit of Americanism." Artist Rose Kohler also found the work to be un-American, writing that "it was felt that in this century and in America, we had advanced sufficiently to cast aside the notions and prejudices of the dark ages." She also designed a monument in response to Sargent’s painting, a medallion entitled Spirit of the Synagogue, which depicted the Synagogue figure as upright and triumphant.

Due to the antisemitic nature of the painting, many asserted that it was inappropriately placed in a public, educational building. Rabbi Henry Raphael Gold found its placement to be unfair to Jewish students. Coburn called the placement of such a mural "distasteful… in a building supported by public taxation", while the B'nai B'rith of Boston had a similar complaint, saying that the mural was "false and insulting" and that it had no place in a public educational institution.

=== Proposed removal ===
The first attempt to remove the painting occurred just after it was unveiled in 1919, when local citizens circulated an unsuccessful petition.

Shortly after, many organizations wrote to the library, arguing for the removal of the painting. These included the National Council of Jewish Women, the Central Conference of American Rabbis, the Young Women’s Hebrew Association, the Young Men’s Hebrew Association, and the Anti Defamation League, as well as the Federation of Churches and Young Men’s Christian Association. However, the library asserted that because the painting was the result of a contract between Sargent and citizen donors, the library could not legally take it down.

In 1922, Representative Silbert introduced a bill that would allow the state to remove the painting. Several religious groups testified in the Massachusetts General Court, the state legislature, spoke in favor of the bill. The bill passed the Massachusetts House of Representatives on June 6, 1922, and passed the Massachusetts Senate on June 9. The bill would have permitted the Massachusetts Department of Education to seize the painting through eminent domain. However, questions were raised as to whether the bill violated the Constitution of Massachusetts, and the Department of Education could not find a suitable place to exhibit Synagogue. The bill was struck down as unconstitutional and repealed in 1924. The same year, an unidentified person smeared an ink-like fluid on the painting.

=== Defense and Sargent's response ===
Sargent himself, averse to controversy and public statements, said little to the press about the controversy. One Boston newspaper reported in 1922 that he "made it known through a friend that no reflection on the Jewish race was intended." Privately, he asserted that the painting was justified due to its medieval precedent, and expressed gratitude that the library allowed it to remain.

After the installation of Synagogue, the final panel of the cycle, a representation of the Sermon on the Mount, was never installed. Although it could be argued that Sargent’s death caused the mural to remain unfinished, Promey notes that Sargent never tried to collect his final payment for the mural, pointing towards the fact that he had stopped working on it.

The American Fine Art Society, following the controversy, passed a resolution defending Sargent, and American Art News wrote that, "whether judiciously chosen or not, the subject was historically correct. It belonged logically in the series."

== Present status ==
The painting remains visible in the Boston Central Library today. Starting in 2003, Harvard Art Museums' Straus Center for Conservation commenced a restoration of the Sargent murals, which was completed in 2004. As part of the renovation, signs explaining the murals were installed alongside the artwork. When the murals were restored, BPL president Bernie Margolis invited several Jewish leaders to observe Synagogue. The Boston Globe wrote that not only had the controversy over the mural largely been forgotten—several Jewish leaders did not even know what the mural depicted until they were informed about it—but there were also no active calls to remove Synagogue, even among Jewish groups.

== See also ==
- List of works by John Singer Sargent
- Ecclesia and Synagoga
