= 1892 in art =

The year 1892 in art involved some significant events.

== Events ==
- February – Claude Monet begins painting his Rouen Cathedral series
- c. February – Alfred Gilbert is commissioned to sculpt the tomb (with recumbent effigy) of Prince Albert Victor, Duke of Clarence, in the Albert Memorial Chapel of St George's Chapel, Windsor Castle, England; although not finished until 1928 it is substantially complete in 1898 as "the finest single example of late 19th-century sculpture in the British Isles"
- March – James McNeill Whistler stages his major retrospective exhibition, Nocturnes, Marines and Chevalet pieces at Goupil & Cie's London gallery, then moves to Paris
- April 4 – Munich Secession
- May
  - The Brotherhood of The Linked Ring is founded by Henry Peach Robinson in England to promote photography as a fine art
  - Claude-Charles Bourgonnier is barred from exhibiting art at the Paris Salon for a two-year period after tearing up one of his own paintings while it is on display
- November – "The Munch Affair": Adelsteen Normann, on behalf of the Union of Berlin Artists, invites Edvard Munch to stage a one-man exhibition. However, his paintings evoke bitter controversy and after one week the exhibition is closed; Munch's paintings are moved to the Equitable Palast
- Charles Rennie Mackintosh and Herbert MacNair are introduced to Margaret and Frances MacDonald in Glasgow
- Il Codice Magliabechiano, a 16th century collection of brief biographies and notes on the works of Italian artists by "Anonimo Gaddiano", is first published

== Awards ==
- Legion of Honour (France) – James McNeill Whistler

== Works of art ==
=== Paintings ===
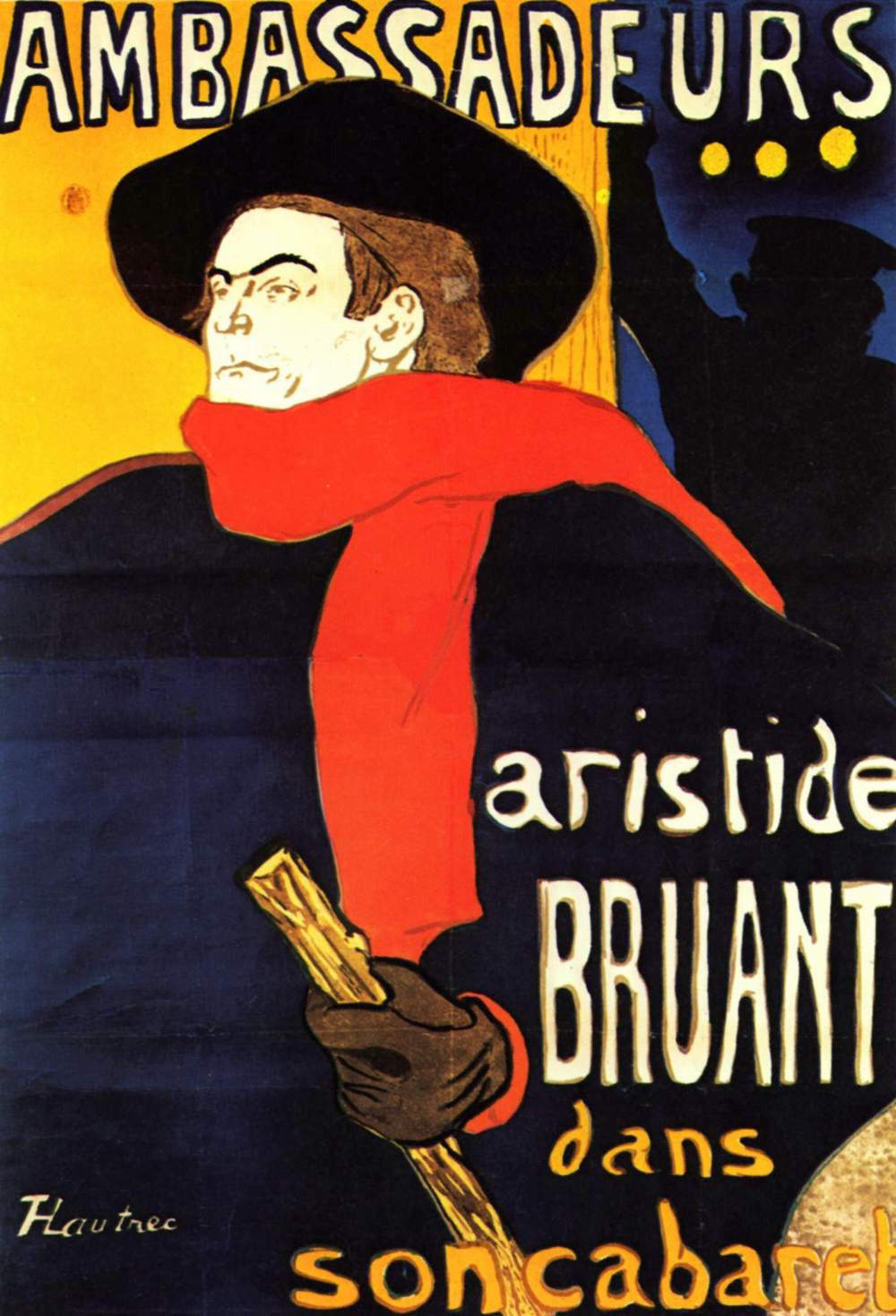
Poster by Toulouse-Lautrec

- Ivan Aivazovsky – Brig "Mercury" Attacked by Two Turkish Ships
- Emmanuel Benner – A Family in the Stone Age
- Almeida Júnior – Leitura ("Reading")
- John Henry Frederick Bacon – The Wedding Morning
- Gustave Caillebotte
  - Nasturtiums
  - Portrait of the artist
- Gustaf Cederström – Magnus Stenbock in Malmö
- John Collier – Lilith
- Thomas Eakins – The Concert Singer
- James Ensor
  - Man of Sorrows (Koninklijk Museum voor Schone Kunsten, Antwerp)
  - The Skate
- Paul Gauguin
  - Aha Oe Feii?
  - Arearea
  - Fatata te Miti ("By the Sea")
  - Spirit of the Dead Watching
  - Te Fare
  - We Shall Not Go to the Market Today
  - When Will You Marry?
- J. W. Godward
  - At The Garden Shrine, Pompeii
  - The Betrothed
  - Classical Beauty
  - Far Away Thoughts (two versions)
  - Leaning On The Balcony
  - The Playground
  - With Violets Wreathed And Robe Of Saffron Hue
- Lydia Purdy Hess – Portrait of Miss E. H.
- P. S. Krøyer – Summer Evening at Skagen. The Artist's Wife and Dog by the Shore
- Evert Larock – The Idiot
- Sir Frederic Leighton – The Garden of the Hesperides
- Isaac Levitan – Evening Bells
- Maximilien Luce – Côte de la citadelle
- Juan Luna
  - The Parisian Life
  - Peuple et Rois
- Jacek Malczewski
  - Christmas Eve in Siberia
  - Self-portrait with palette
- John Everett Millais – Blow, Blow, Thou Winter Wind
- Francis Davis Millet
  - An Autumn Idyll
  - Between Two Fires
- Albert Joseph Moore – Lightning and Light
- Edvard Munch
  - Evening on Karl Johan
  - Inger in Black and Violet
- John Pettie – Bonnie Prince Charlie Entering the Ballroom at Holyroodhouse
  - August Strindberg
- Camille Pissarro
  - Bank Holiday, Kew
  - Kew Green
- John Singer Sargent – Mrs. Hugh Hammersley
- Henri de Toulouse-Lautrec
  - La Goulue arriving at the Moulin Rouge (Museum of Modern Art, New York)
  - Le Lit
  - At the Moulin Rouge
  - At the Moulin Rouge: two women waltzing
  - Quadrille at the Moulin Rouge
  - Posters for Aristide Bruant
- Henry Scott Tuke – Mrs Florence Humphris
- Félix Vallotton
  - Bathers on a Summer Evening (1892–93)
  - The Invalid
- Édouard Vuillard – Self-Portrait
- James McNeill Whistler – Portrait of Robert de Montesquiou

=== Sculptures ===
- Charles E. Barber – United States Barber coinage
- Jean-Léon Gérôme – Bellona
- Felix Görling – Statue of Alexander von Humboldt (Chicago)
- Richard Henry Park – John Plankinton statue
- Jeronimo Sunol – Statue of Christopher Columbus (Central Park, New York City)

=== Other ===
- The Diamond Trellis Egg is presented to Maria Feodorovna by her husband Alexander III of Russia

== Births ==
- 29 February – Augusta Savage, African American sculptor (died 1962).
- 5 March - Dean Cornwell, American illustrator, painter, and muralist (died 1960)
- 14 March – Charles Wheeler, English sculptor (died 1974).
- 4 April – Italo Mus, Italian painter (died 1967)
- 8 May – Luigi Del Bianco, Italian-born American sculptor (died 1969)
- 12 May – Colin Gill, English war artist, muralist and portrait painter (died 1940).
- 14 May – Marjorie Watson-Williams, English painter (died 1984).
- 19 May – Wilhelm Heise, German painter (died 1965).
- 30 May – Fernando Amorsolo, Filipino painter (died 1972).
- 31 May – Michel Kikoine, painter (died 1968).
- 30 June – Wilhelm Schnarrenberger, German painter (died 1966).
- 15 July – Walter Benjamin, German philosopher, "comparatists" and art critic (died 1940).
- July 19 – Suzanne Malherbe, French illustrator and designer (died 1972).
- July 24 – Marcel Gromaire, French painter (died 1971).
- 7 August – Einar Forseth, Swedish artist.
- 16 August – Otto Messmer, American animator (died 1983).
- 11 October – Anton Räderscheidt, German painter (died 1970).
- 16 October – Adolf Ziegler, German painter and politician (died 1959).
- 23 November – Romain de Tirtoff, Russian-born French artist and designer (died 1990).
- 7 December – Stuart Davis, American painter (died 1964).
- Undated
  - Lang Jingshan, Chinese photographer (died 1995).
  - Veljko Stanojević, Serbian painter (died 1967).

== Deaths ==
- January 11 – Amanda Sidwall, Swedish painter and illustrator (born 1844)
- January 14 – Alexander Jackson Davis, American architect and illustrator (born 1803)
- January 15 – Randolph Rogers, American neoclassical sculptor (born 1825)
- January 20 – Louis Pierre Henriquel-Dupont, French engraver (born 1797)
- February 27 – Louis Vuitton, French designer (born 1821)
- March 3 – Fedor Solntsev, Russian painter and art historian (born 1801)
- March 21 – Anthon van Rappard, Dutch painter (born 1858)
- June 1 – Louis Janmot, French painter (born 1814)
- October 5 – Albert Aurier, French Symbolist poet, art critic and painter (born 1865)
- October 7 – Thomas Woolner, English sculptor and poet (born 1825)
- October 29 – William Harnett, Irish American trompe l'oeil painter (born 1848)
- December 9 – Ernst Klimt, Austrian mural painter (born 1864)
- Undated
  - Walter Hood Fitch, British botanical artist (born 1817)
  - Serafino De Tivoli, Italian painter (born 1826)
