= Edmond Malassis =

French painter (1874–1944)

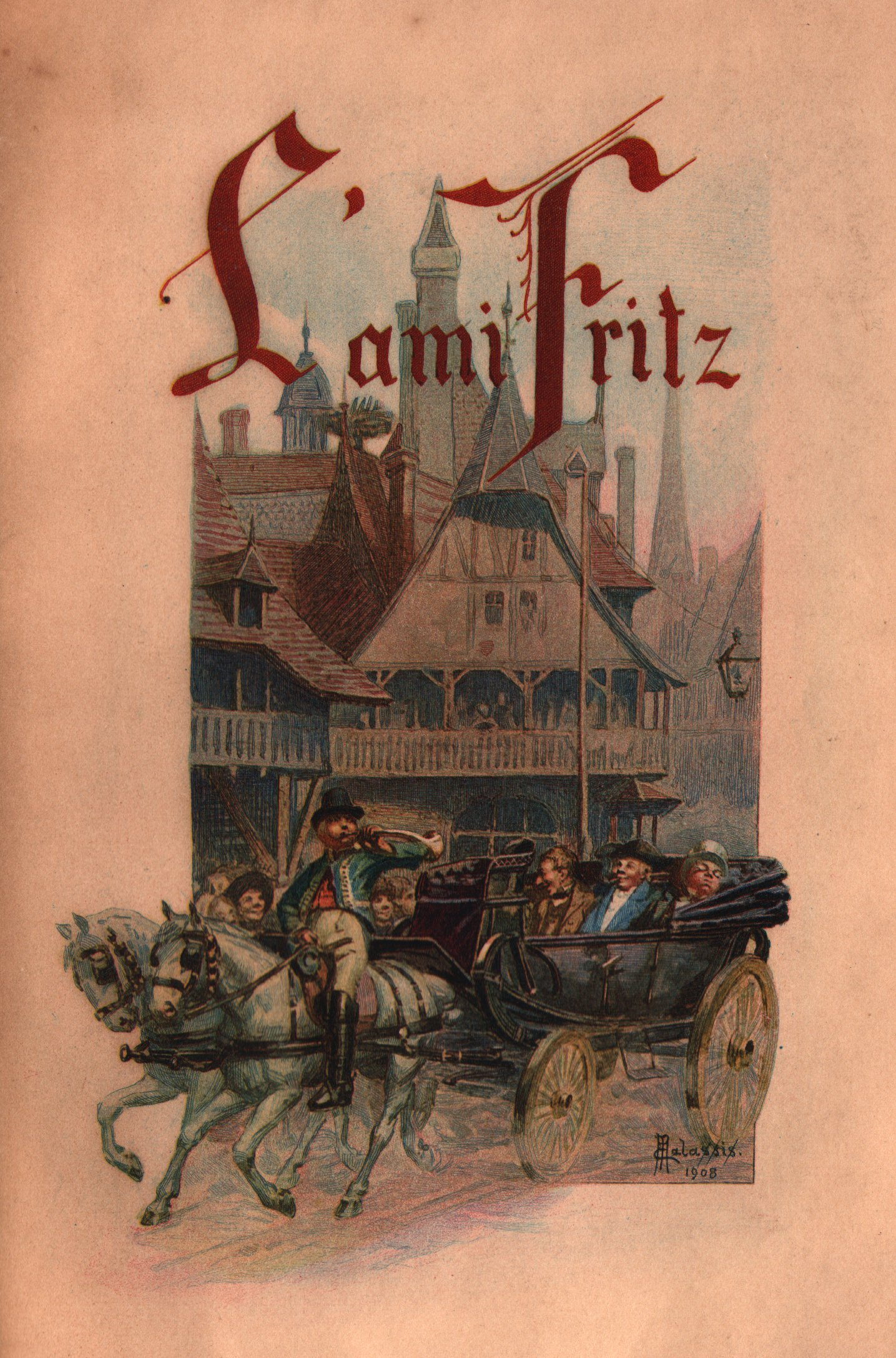
Cover of L'Ami Fritz (1909)

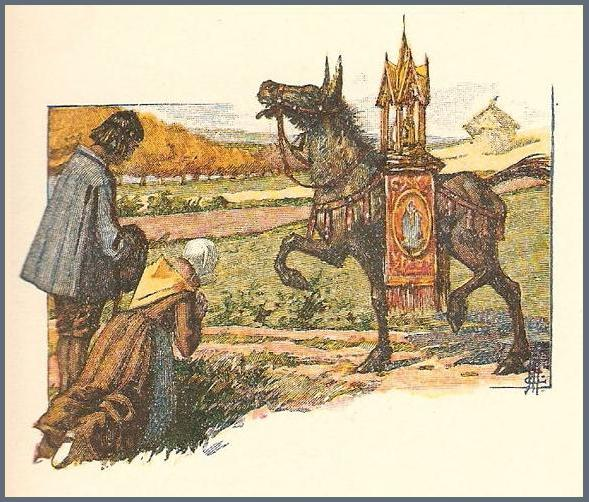
Illustration of La Fontaine's "The Ass Carrying Relics" from Fables Choisies (Paris, 1930)

Edmond Malassis (14 December 1874 – 3 September 1944) was a French painter and illustrator.

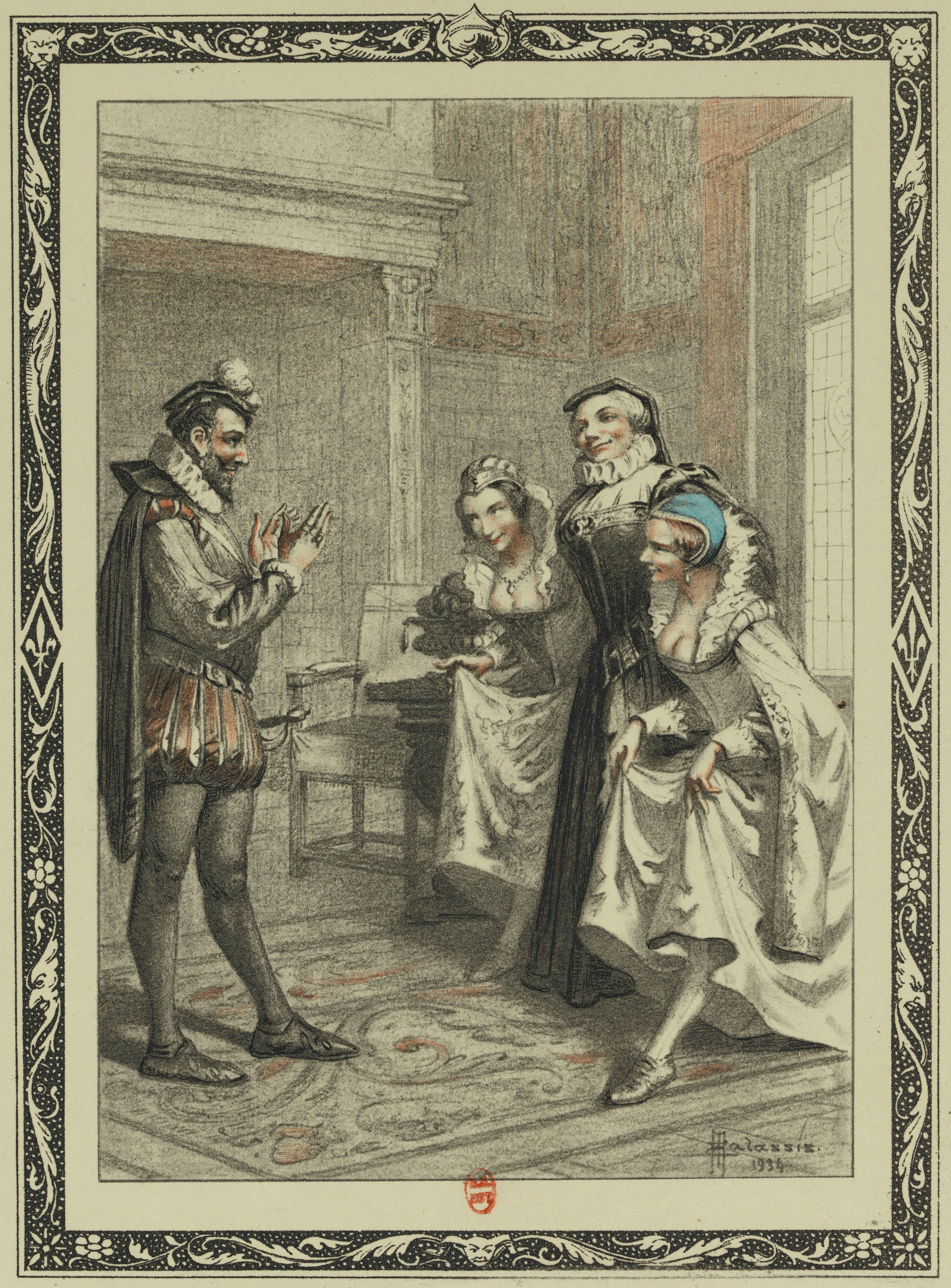
Vies des dames galantes (1934)

== Life ==
Edmond Malassis was born in the 10th arrondissement of Paris on 14 December 1874. He was a pupil of Gustave Moreau, and became a watercolourist.

Malassis worked primarily in the first half of the 20th century. A prolific book illustrator, he did not do his own engravings. In 1935, he exhibited at the galerie de l'Écale in the Faubourg Saint-Honoré, Paris.

He died in his home in the 7th arrondissement of Paris on 3 September 1944, aged sixty-nine.

== Illustrated works ==
1. Edmond Haraucourt, La Légende des sexes. Poèmes hystériques (Brussels, 1882)
2. Balzac, La Belle Impéria (Paris: Louis Conard, 1903)
3. Théodore de Banville, Gringoire, comedy in one act, in prose (Paris: Louis Conard, 1904)
4. André Couvreur, Caresco surhomme, ou le voyage en Eucrasie, conte humain (Paris: Plon, 1904)
5. Balzac, Les joyeuzetés du roy Loys le Unzième (Paris: Louis Conard, 1907)
6. Erckmann-Chatrian, L'Ami Fritz (Paris: Louis Conard, 1909)
7. Pierre Louÿs, Aphrodite, Mœurs antiques (Paris: M. H. Couderc de Saint-Chamant, 1910)
  - The original copy was illustrated by Claude-Charles Bourgonnier and Adolphe Giraldon. Malassis illustrated two copies.
8. Anatole France, Le Crime de Sylvestre Bonnard (Paris: Carteret, 1921)
9. Guy de Maupassant, La Morte (Paris, 1922)
  - A unique copy illustrated with original watercolours.
10. Voltaire, Candide (Paris: Carteret, 1922)
11. Charles Baudelaire, Amoenitates Belgicae, epigrams published by François Montel (Paris: Éditions Excelsior, 1925)
12. Stendhal, L'Abbesse de Castro (Paris: Javal et Bourdeaux, 1930)
  - Copper-engraved by Delzers and Feltesse.
13. La Fontaine, Fables choisies (Paris: Louis Connard, 1930–1933)
  - Illustrated by Fred Money, woodcuts in colours by André and Paul Baudier, decorative compositions by Pierre Laprade.
14. Louis XI (attribution), Les Cent Nouvelles (Paris: P. Javal and Bourdeaux, 1931)
  - Originally engraved on copper by Lorrain.
15. Brantôme, Les Vies des dames galantes (Paris: Le Vasseur et Cie, 1935)
16. Théodore de Banville, Florise (Paris: A. and F. Ferroud, 1936)
17. Richard Wagner, La Tétralogie, translated by Albert Pauphilet (Paris: Piazza, 1941)
18. Joseph Bédier (adaptation), Le Roman de Tristan et Iseut (Paris: Piazza, 1942)
  - Frontispiece and ornamentation.
