= Tahitian Women on the Beach =

1891 painting by Paul Gauguin

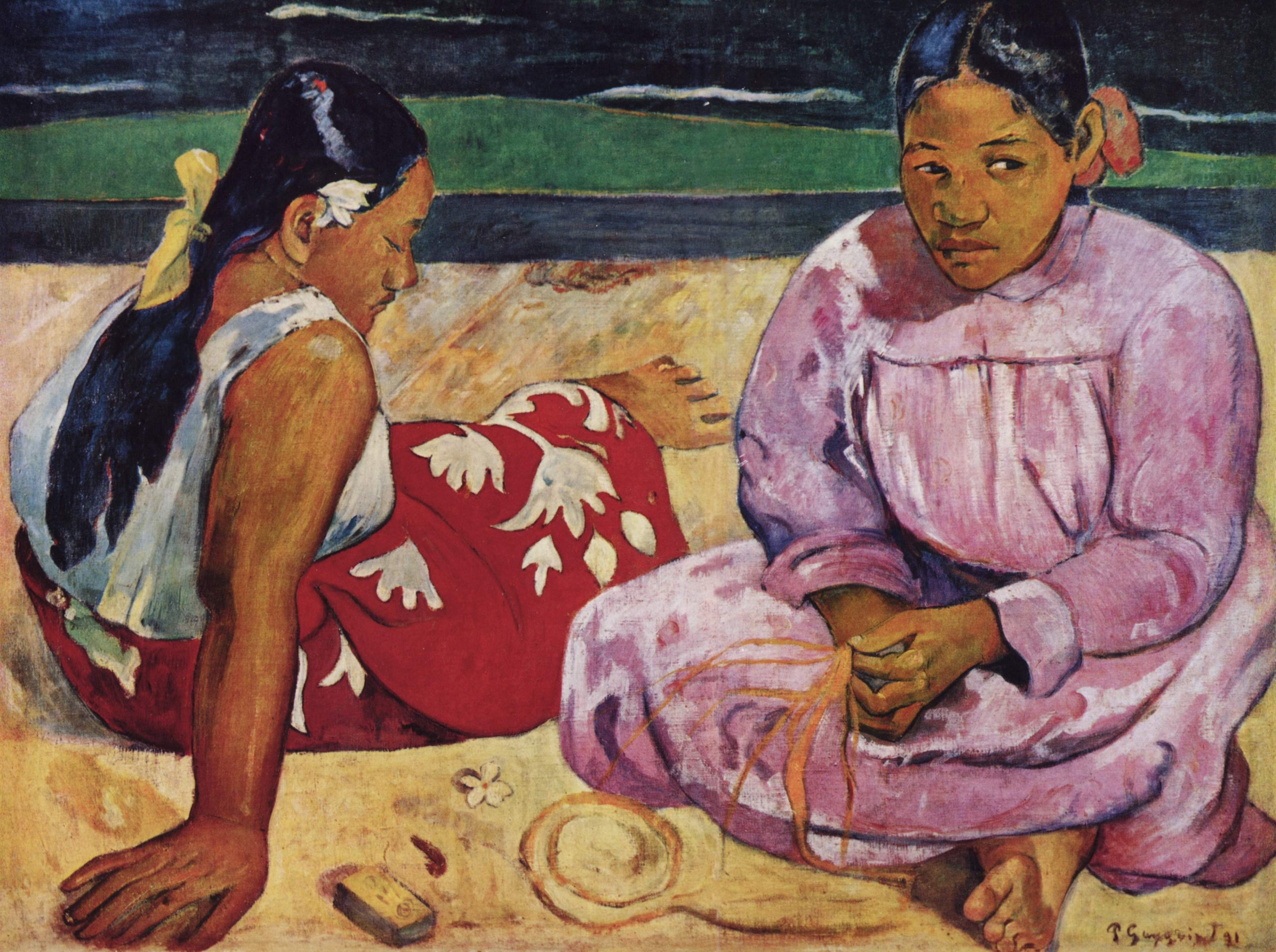
- Artist: Paul Gauguin
- Year: 1891
- Medium: oil on canvas
- Dimensions: 69 cm × 91 cm (27.2 in × 35.8 in)
- Location: Musée d'Orsay, Paris

Tahitian Women on the Beach (French: Femmes de Tahiti) is an oil painting by the French artist Paul Gauguin. Depicting two Tahitian women, this piece is one of a series of works completed by Gauguin during his first stay on the Pacific island chain. Enamored by the environment and people of the islands and their separation from European cultural and aesthetic attitudes, Gauguin portrays two figures shrouded in the mystery and symbolism of Tahiti's paradise.

The painting is currently in the collection of the Musée d'Orsay, located in Paris, France.

== Context ==
The painting was constructed towards the conclusion of the artist's first trip to Tahiti (1891–1893). Gauguin had travelled to the French Colony in search of what he described as "ecstasy, calm, and art," away from European materialism. These ideas reflected what he described in his letters to Van Gogh as "the savageness...that is also in myself." Although France's colonial impact by that point washed away some of these qualities he had hoped to find, Gauguin nevertheless was productive and created this particular piece within the context of a greater series of many other works. Art historians today most associate these works with Gauguin's symbolist, syntheticist, and primitive styles. The works depict natives (almost all of whom are women) in an ideal, unspoiled Eden.

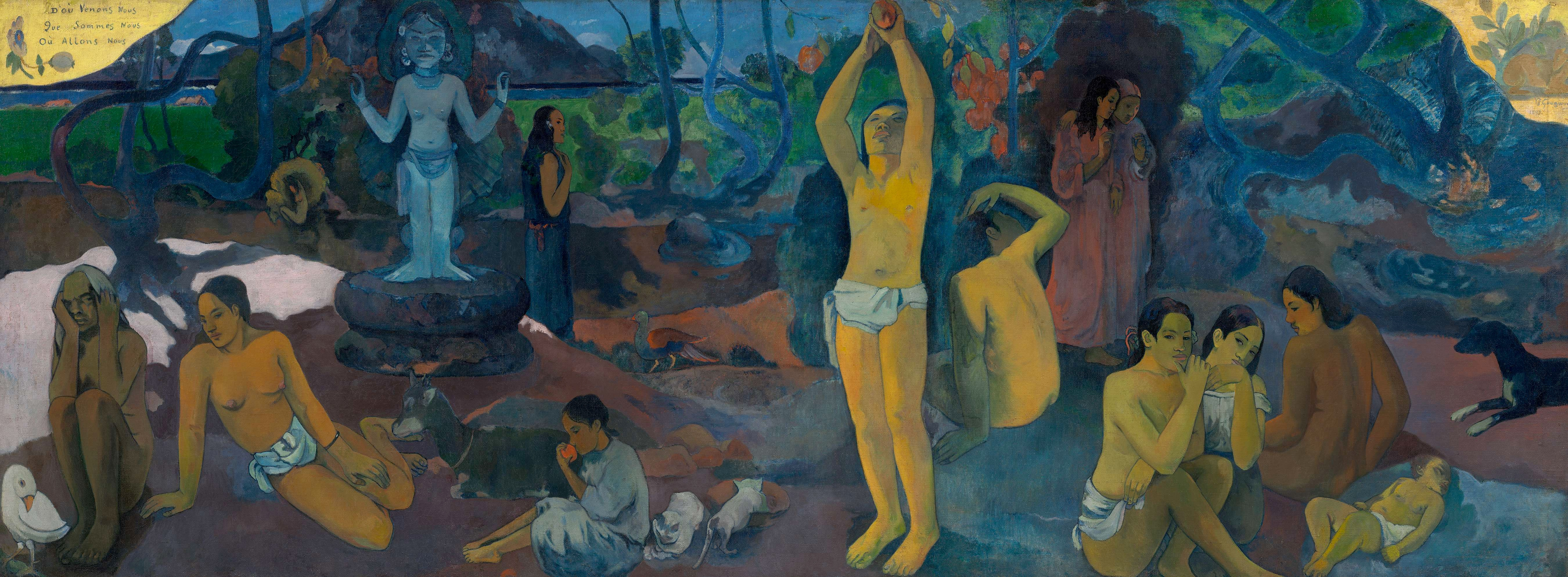
Gauguin, Where Do We Come From? What Are We? Where Are We Going?, 1897

These works belong to the middle point in Gauguin's career; they center on Tahitian subjects yet while retaining a sense of reality that is less present in his later works such as Where Do We Come From? What Are We? Where Are We Going?, which focus less on observation and more on the symbolic and supernatural. Tahitian Women on the Beach was eventually sent by Gauguin to Paris to be exhibited by Durand-Ruel at the suggestion of Gauguin's friend and biggest supporter, Edgar Degas.

== Composition and analysis ==
The piece depicts two Tahitian women sitting statically in a state of aloof indolence. Although a topic of debate amongst art historians, the title is misleading in that the two women may not be on the beach. The diagonal lines in the ocher and yellow paint zones as well as the white lines in the background separating the green and blue may represent architecture rather than sand and waves. The art historian Charles Stuckey suggests that the ambiguity only adds to the mystery and sense of unknown felt in the piece. Unlike his previous Tahitian paintings, these women aren't actively engaged in any type of work. While the woman on the left is wearing traditional native pareu, the one on the right is covered by a missionary dress that indicates French colonial influence and the enduring presence of Christian missionary efforts upon the islands.

The women themselves are mysterious, evoking melancholy. Gauguin was mystified by this new world and its silence in particular, which he said "is even stranger than anything else...I can understand why these people can remain hours and days sitting immobile and gazing at the sky." This silence and the women's reflection of it is palpable, challenging European conceptions of paradise and instead revealing the mystery behind it. The women's features also challenge existing ideas. Their deep amber-colored skin and powerful physiques display immense musculature, making them almost androgynous figures that are more akin to sculptures. At the same time, their faces seem more like masks, turning the painting away from portraiture towards genre. By depicting them this way, Gauguin challenges European notions of beauty and paradise.

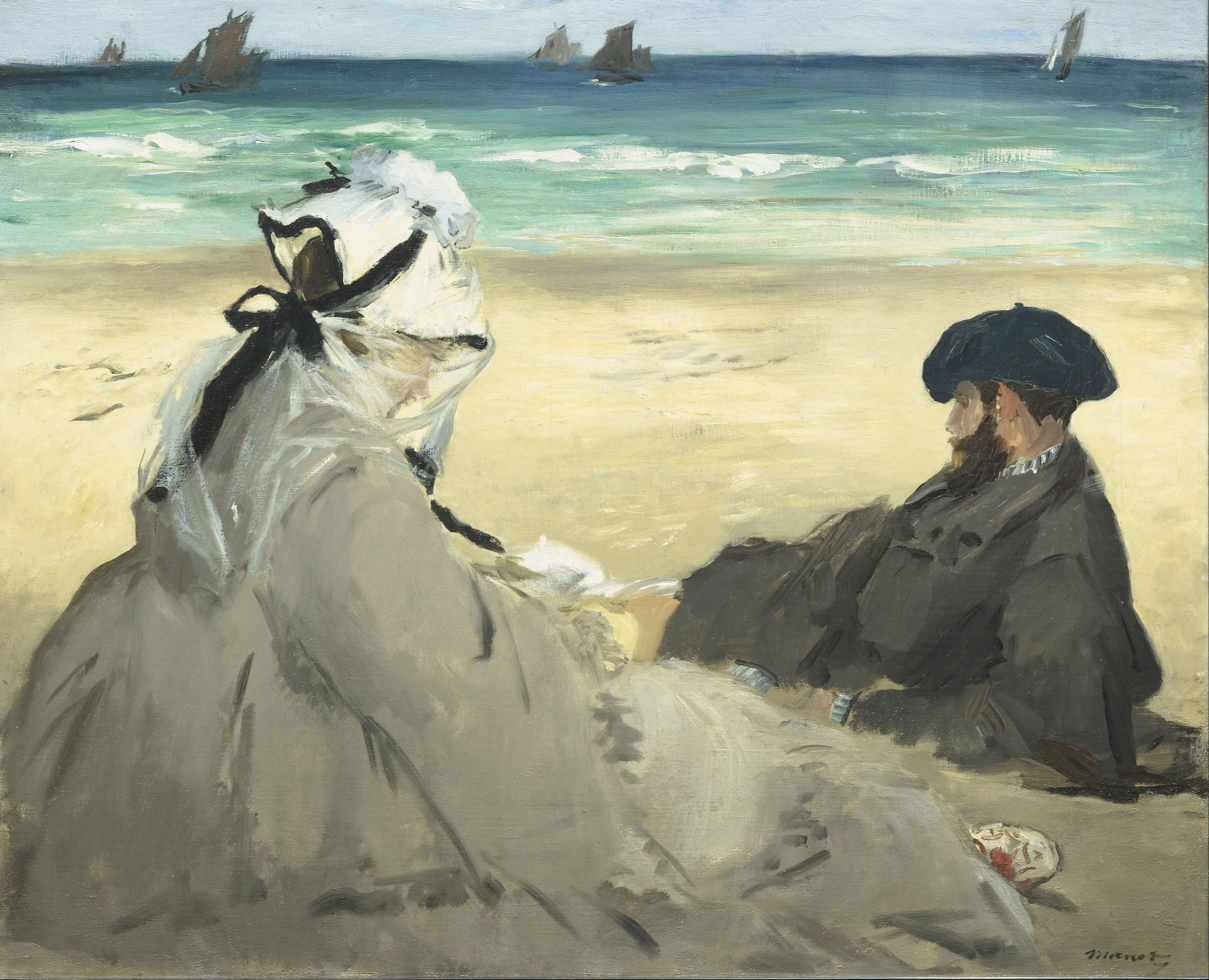
Manet, On the Beach, 1873

Compositionally, the painting departs from the conventions of the era. Gauguin crowds the two figures into the space of the canvas, yet they are completely independent of one another. Art historians have compared this aspect of the work to the treatment of figures in Manet's On the Beach.

The colors Gauguin employs include orange, yellow, pink, ocher, deep reds, turquoises, and browns. These colors are arranged in an ornamental and pattern-like structure. The elements of line and color form simplified shapes and motifs. This construction is typical of symbolism, synthetism/cloisonism, and primitivism. While the painting is centered on reality unlike his later works, Gauguin's observations of Tahitian life are deconstructed through his composition to highlight the mystery and strangeness around the idea of Tahiti's paradise, bending the conceptions of this reality. Gauguin achieved this symbolic conception of the women and their environment through his usage of synthetism. A term he coined himself, it was derived from cloisonism, which used dark lines to separate flat sections of color to reduce the sense of the real, observable subject and instead focus on the inner, symbolic poetry of it. The piece, through this technique, blends the reality of Gauguin's observations with this mystical world. This mysticism also relates to the painting's most controversial aspect: primitivism. Art historians long described the work as part of Gauguin's reaction against the "oppressiveness" of European civilization. However, more recently, art historians have criticized this work as a reflection of colonial imperialism over natives, suggesting that this painting and others involved exploitation of native "savageness."

== Parau Api (What News?) ==
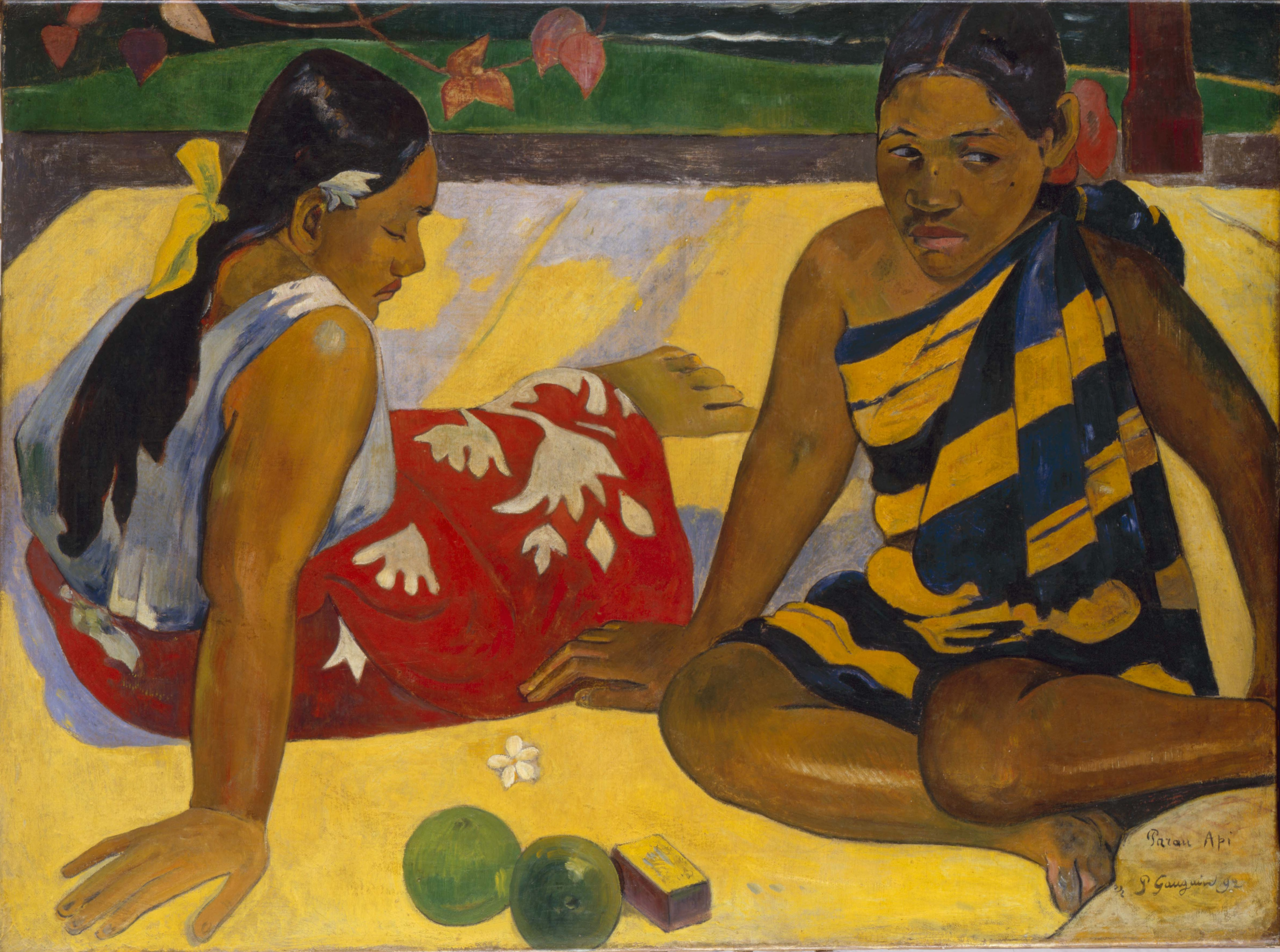
Gauguin, Parau api (What News?), 1892

Parau api, completed in 1892, is a variant reproduction of Tahitian Women on the Beach. Gauguin was reportedly enraged when Parau api was sold, and the work underscores how important Tahitian Women on the Beach was to him. It contains virtually all the same elements but includes a number of modifications. Gauguin removes the missionary dress for a striped pareu. The ocher color is also replaced with a deep yellow. Most importantly, however, the addition of a wood post in the upper-right corner of the piece provides some additional evidence that in fact the women are not on the beach but rather sit on a traditional Tahitian veranda. Parau api is currently exhibited at the Staatliche Kunstsammlungen in Dresden, Germany.

== Gallery ==
Paintings from Gauguin's first trip to Tahiti
Gauguin, Aha oe feii? (What? Are You Jealous?), 1892

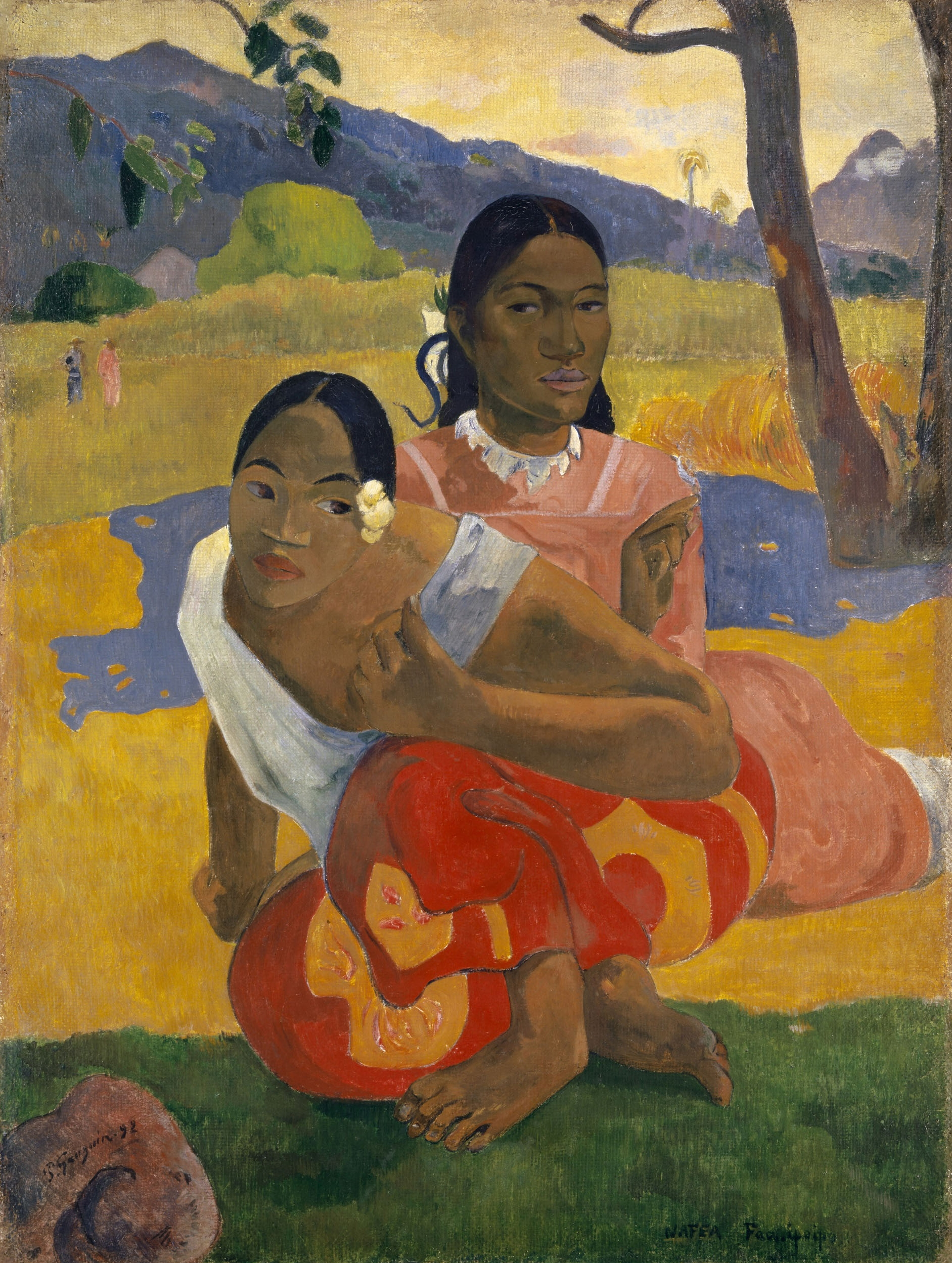
Gauguin, Nafea faa ipoipo (When Will You Marry?), 1892

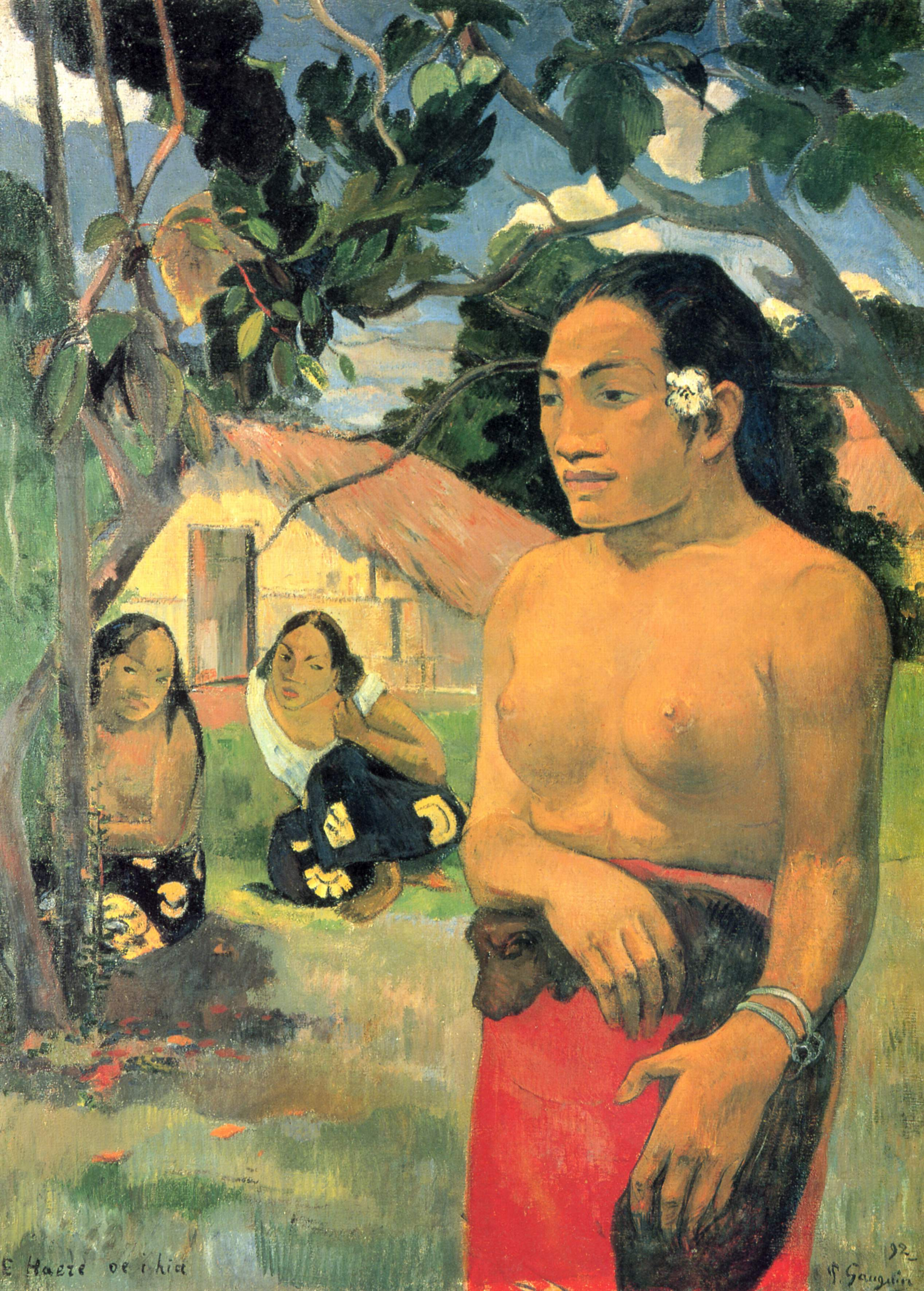
Gauguin, E haere oe i hia (Where Are You Going?), 1892

== See also ==
List of paintings by Paul Gauguin
