= Claude-Charles =

Claude-Charles or Claude Charles is a masculine given name, combining Claude and Charles. Notable people with this name include:

- Claude-Charles Bourgonnier (1860–1921), French painter and lithographer
- Claude Charles Castleton (1893–1916), Australian sergeant
- Claude Charles Chevalley (1909–1984), French mathematician
- Claude-Charles Dallet (1829–1878), French missionary
- Claude Charles Fauriel (1772–1844), French historian
- Claude Charles Goureau (1790–1879), French soldier and entomologist
- Claude Charles Marie du Campe de Rosamel (1774–1848), French politician and naval officer
- Claude Charles McColloch (1888–1959), American politician and judge
- Claude Charles du Tisné (fl. 1719), French explorer
- Claude Charles Vaché (1926-2009), American prelate
