= Between Two Fires (painting) =

Painting by Francis Davis Millet

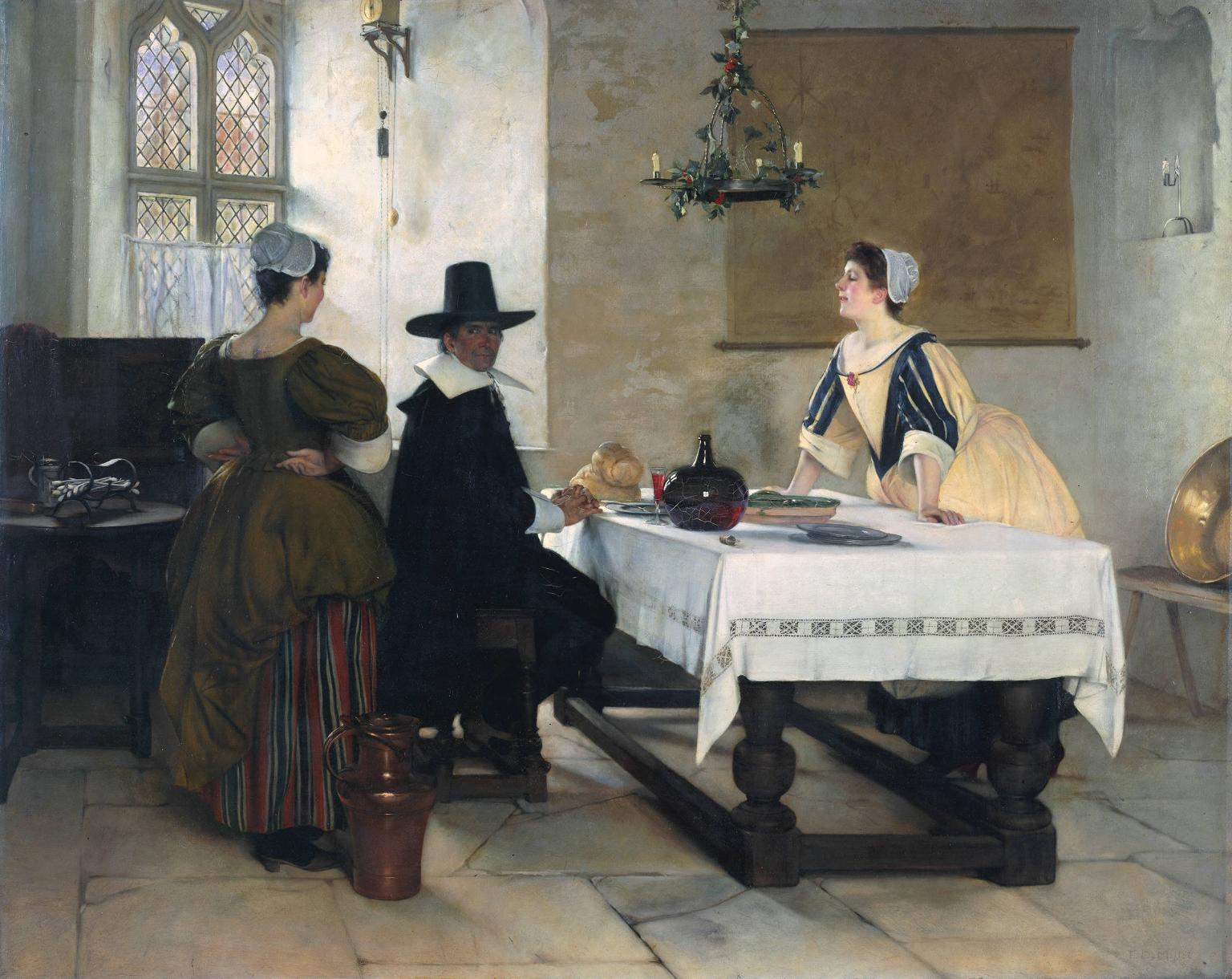
- Artist: Francis David Millet
- Year: 1892
- Type: Oil on canvas, genre painting
- Dimensions: 91.4 cm × 74 cm (36.0 in × 29 in)
- Location: Tate Britain, London

Between Two Fires is an 1892 oil painting by the American artist Francis Davis Millet. A genre painting, it humorously depicts a seventeenth century English Puritan about to say Grace but is diverted by the more worldly presence of two attractive serving maids who stand alluring in front of him under a sprig of mistletoe. Millet settled in Britain and helped establish the artists colony at Broadway. It was at Abbots Grange, the monastic ruin which he used as an art studio and where he produced this picture.

The painting was displayed at the Royal Academy Exhibition of 1892 at Burlington House in London. It was acquired for the nation through the Chantrey Bequest and is now in the collection of Tate Britain.

== Bibliography ==
- Kenin, Richard. Americans in England, 1760-1940. Holt, Rinehart and Winston, 1979.
- Luhrs, Kathleen (ed ) American Paintings in the Metropolitan Museum of Art. The Museum, 1980.
