= Le Lit (Toulouse-Lautrec) =

Painting by Henri de Toulouse-Lautrec

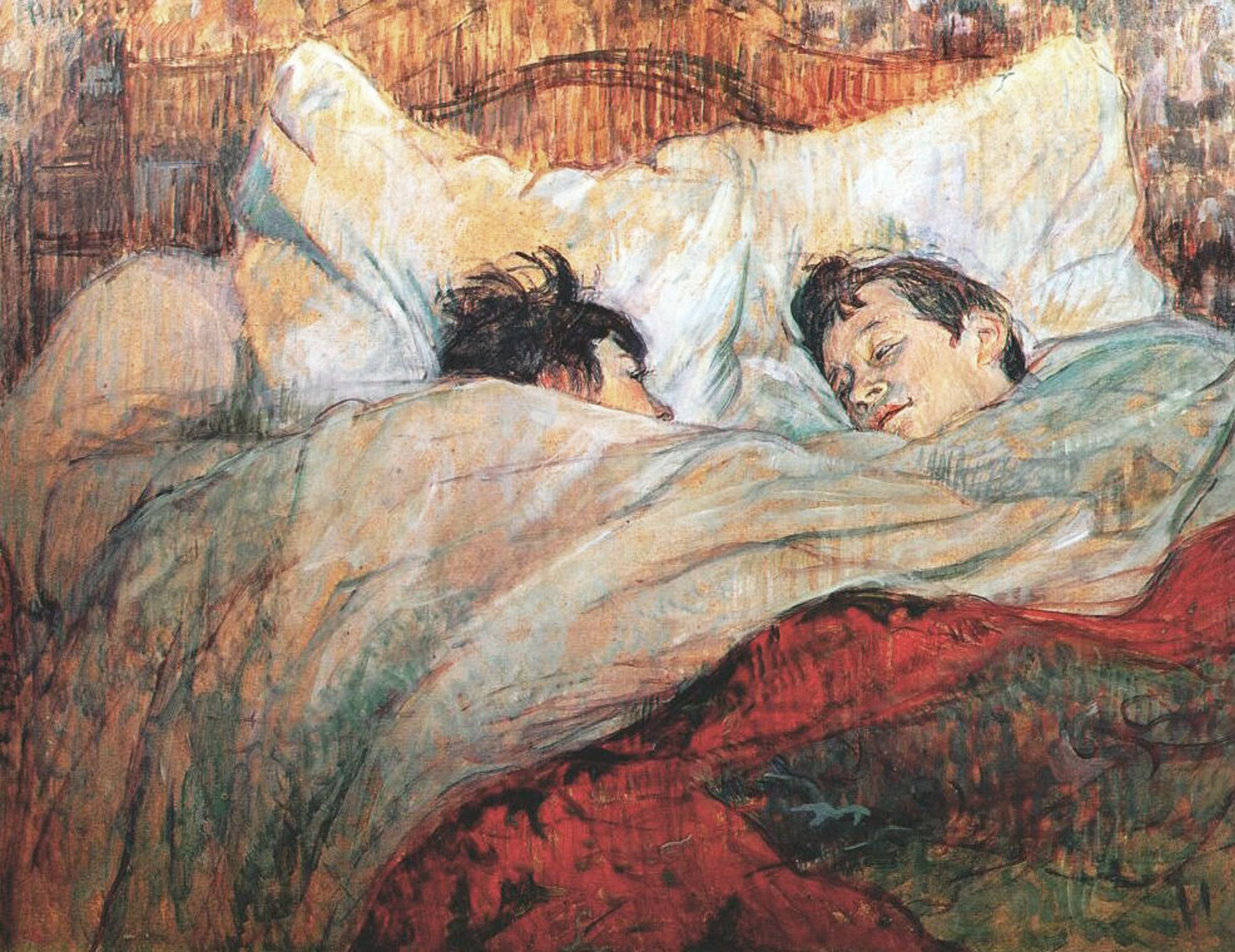
Le Lit, 1892, Musée d'Orsay

Le Lit ('The Bed') (also known as Dans le lit, 'In Bed') is a painting by Henri de Toulouse-Lautrec from around 1892 which depicts two women sharing a blanket or a bed. The painting has been held by public collections in France since 1937, and by the Musée d'Orsay in Paris since 1986.

== Inspiration ==
Toulouse-Lautrec became fascinated by the nightlife in Paris, particularly prostitutes. Through the 1890s, he spent more and more time painting everyday scenes of life in the official brothels, the maisons closes. In 1892, he was commissioned to produce paintings for the salon at a brothel on the rue d'Ambroise. He spent time observing the brothel, its residents and visitors, while they worked and at quieter moments, and made sixteen portraits of the prostitutes. These paintings demonstrate a close and intimate observation and compassion towards the subjects, without any sense of sensationalism or voyeurism.

== Description ==
Le Lit was made in oil paints on cardboard, mounted on wood, and measures 53.5 by 70 centimetres (21.1 in × 27.6 in).

The painting is one of four paintings of similar date depicting individuals in bed, often interpreted as lesbian couples.

It depicts two women in a bed, gazing at each other. The white sheets of the bed contrast with a red bedspread and with the headboard and wall behind. The disembodied heads of the women face each other, their bodies concealed beneath mountains of bedclothes. The painting is suffused by a warm glow, perhaps the rosy morning light, or a gas lamp.

The painting was exhibited in Paris at the Le Barc de Boutteville gallery during the third exhibition of the Impressionists and symbolists (November 15, 1892 to circa February 1893).

== History ==
The painting was in the collection of French art collector Roger Marx. After Marx died in December 1913, it was sold the following year to another collector, Antonin Personnaz. After Personnaz died in December 1936, it was donated to the French state in 1937. It was held initially in the Musée du Louvre, and then transferred to the Musée d'Orsay in 1986.

A similar work, Au lit, le baiser, showing two women kissing, was sold at Sotheby's in London in February 2015 for £10,789,000, and another similarly titled work was sold at Christie's in New York in November 2015 for US$12,485,000.

== Gallery ==
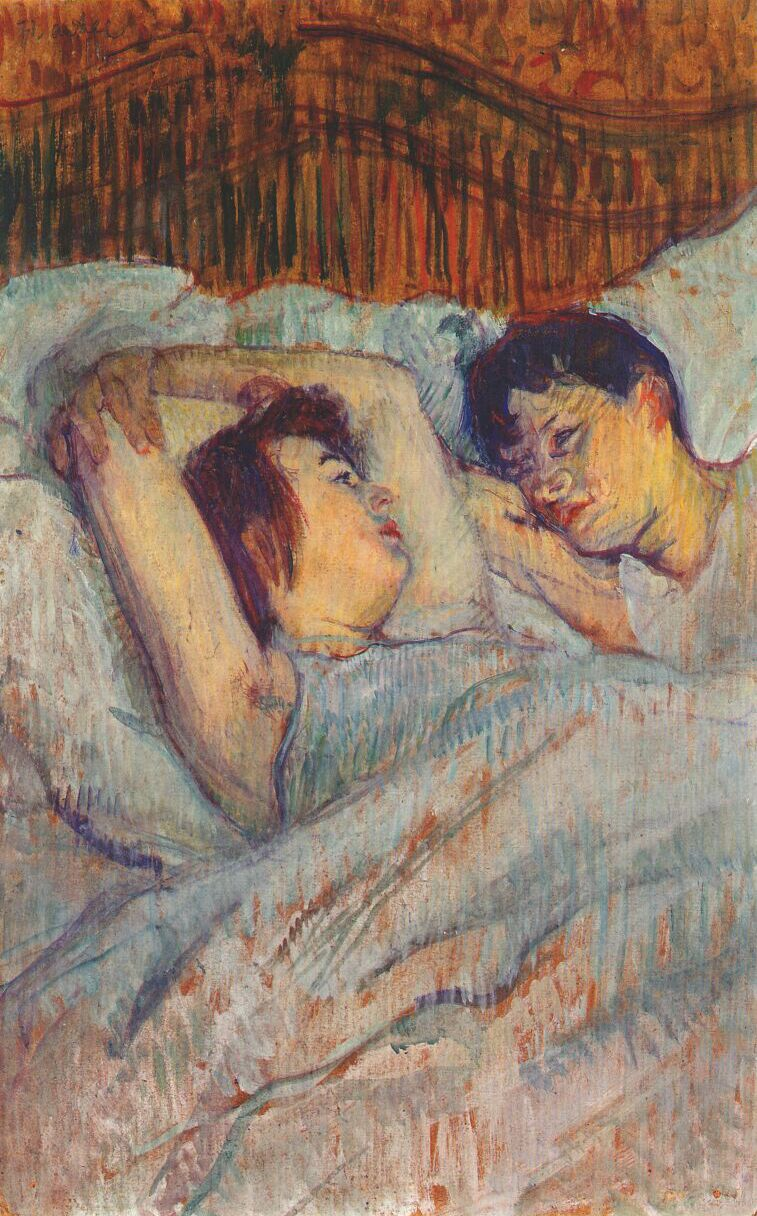
In bed, 1892

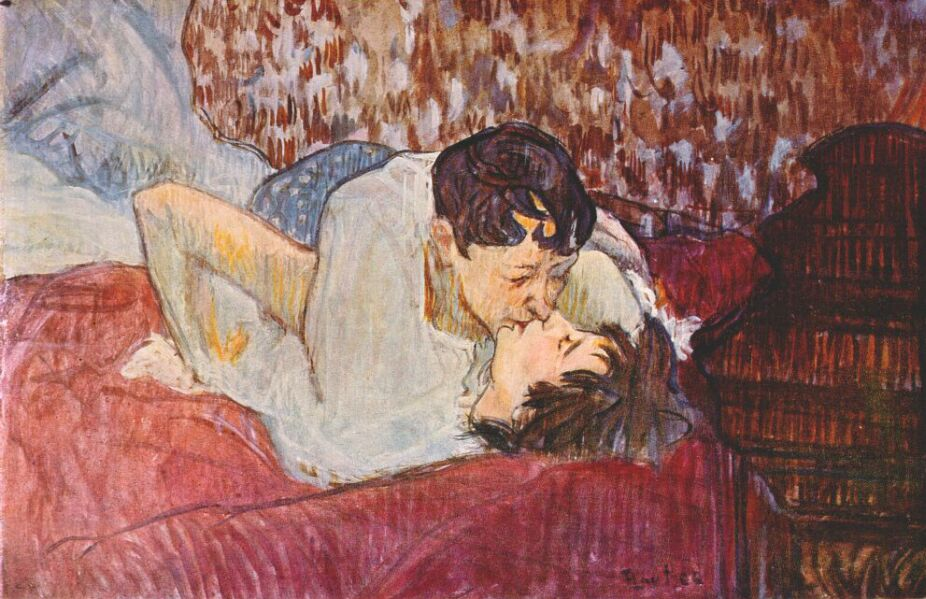
Au lit: le baiser, 1892

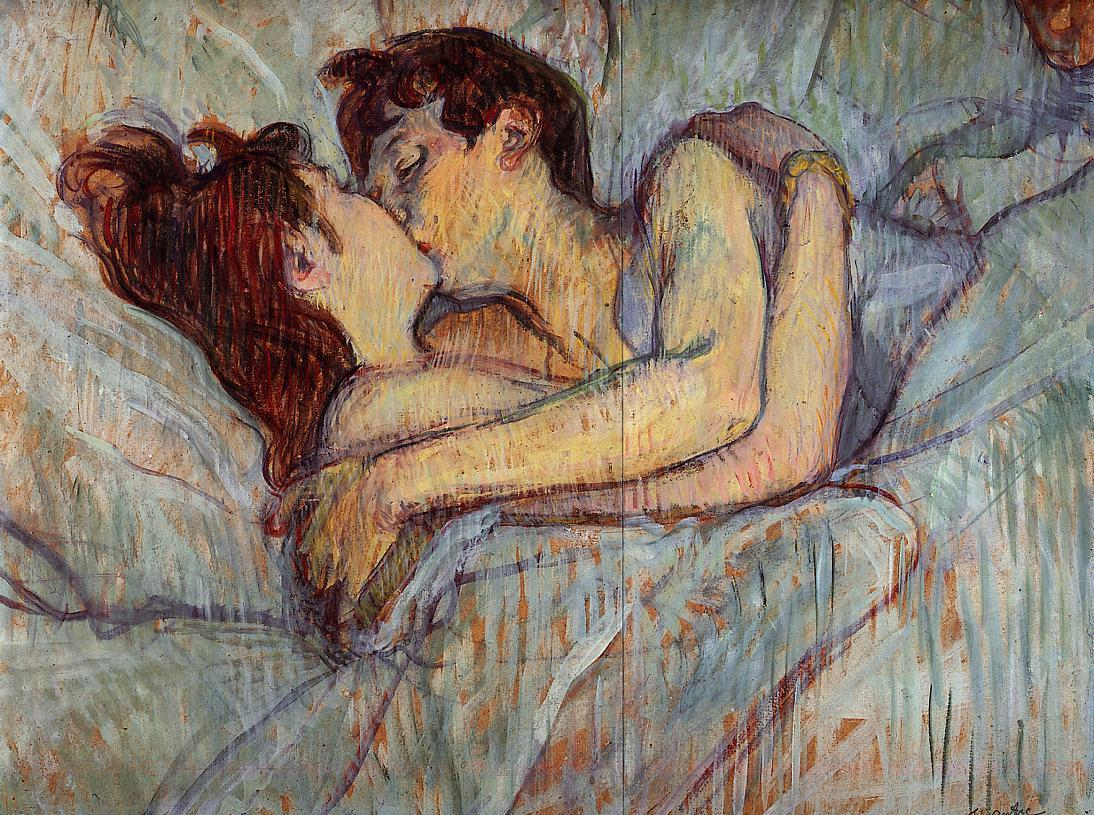
Au lit: le baiser, 1892-93
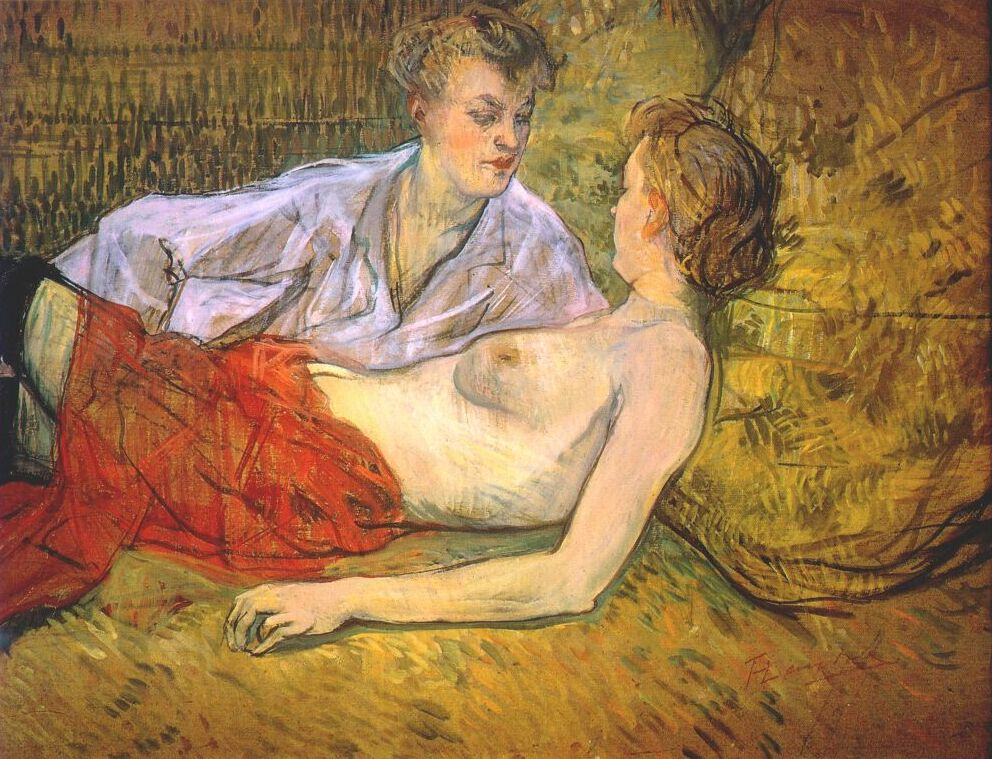
Les deux amies, 1894–1895, Foundation E. G. Bührle

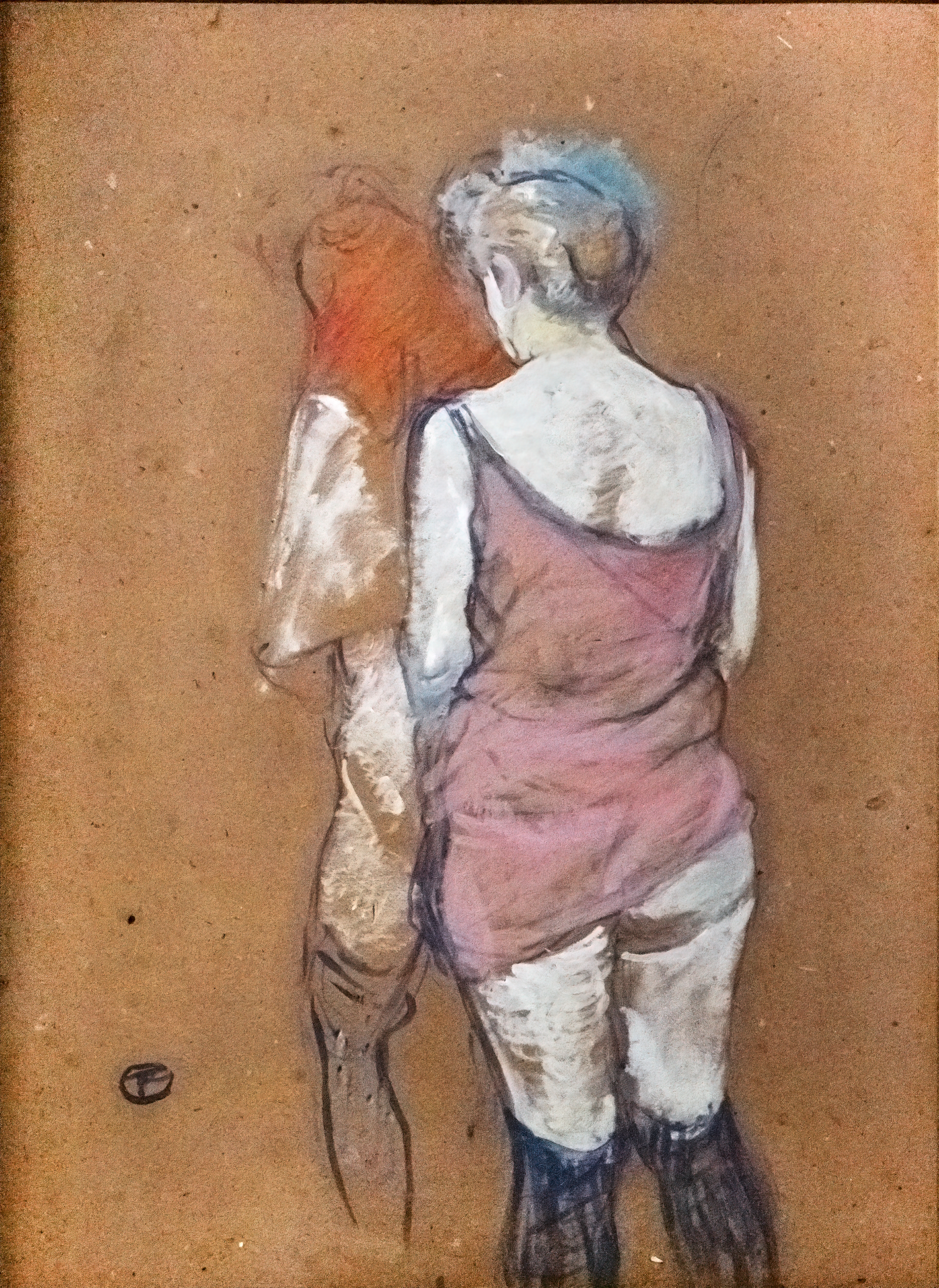
Two half-naked women

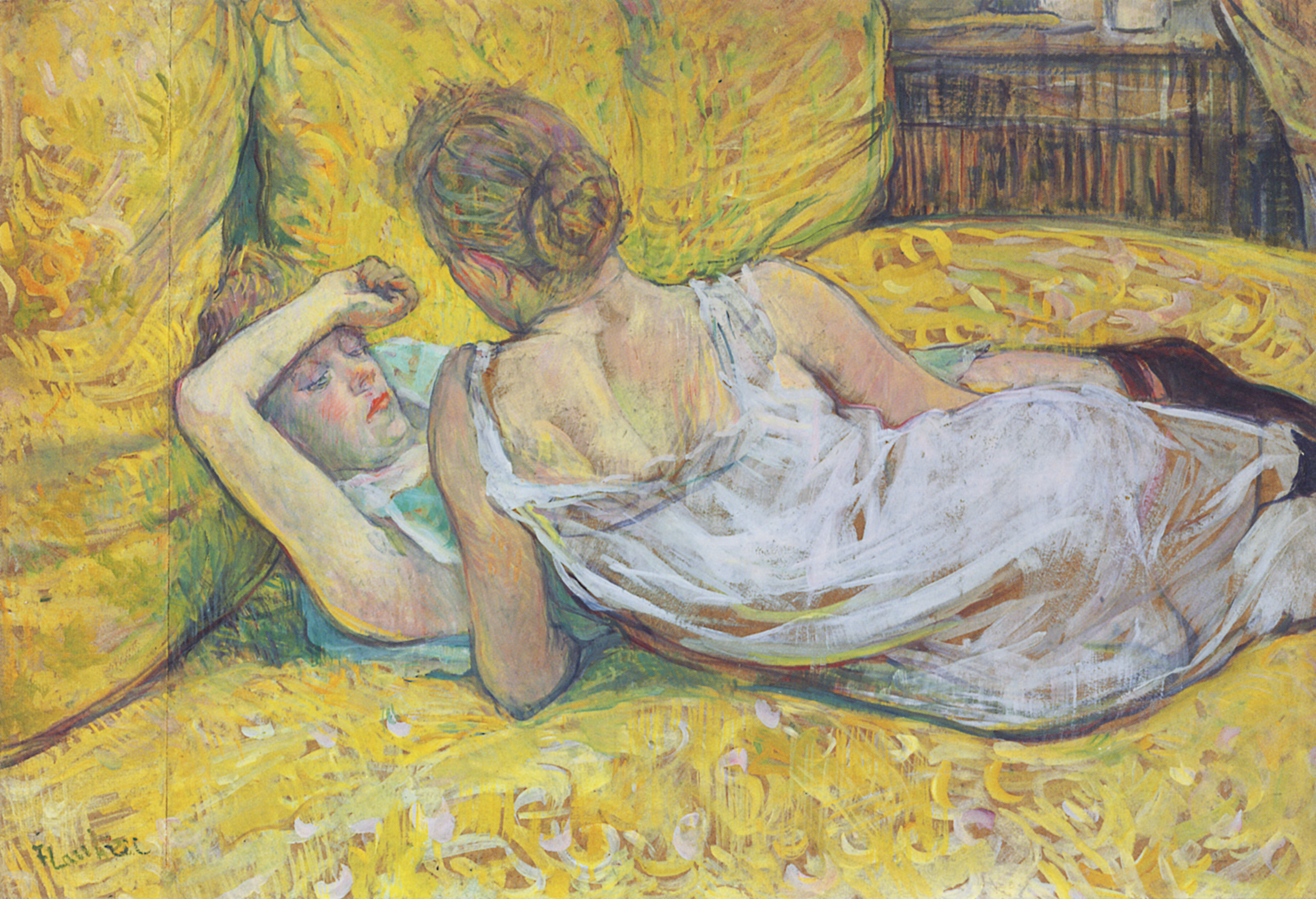
L'abandon (Les deux amies)

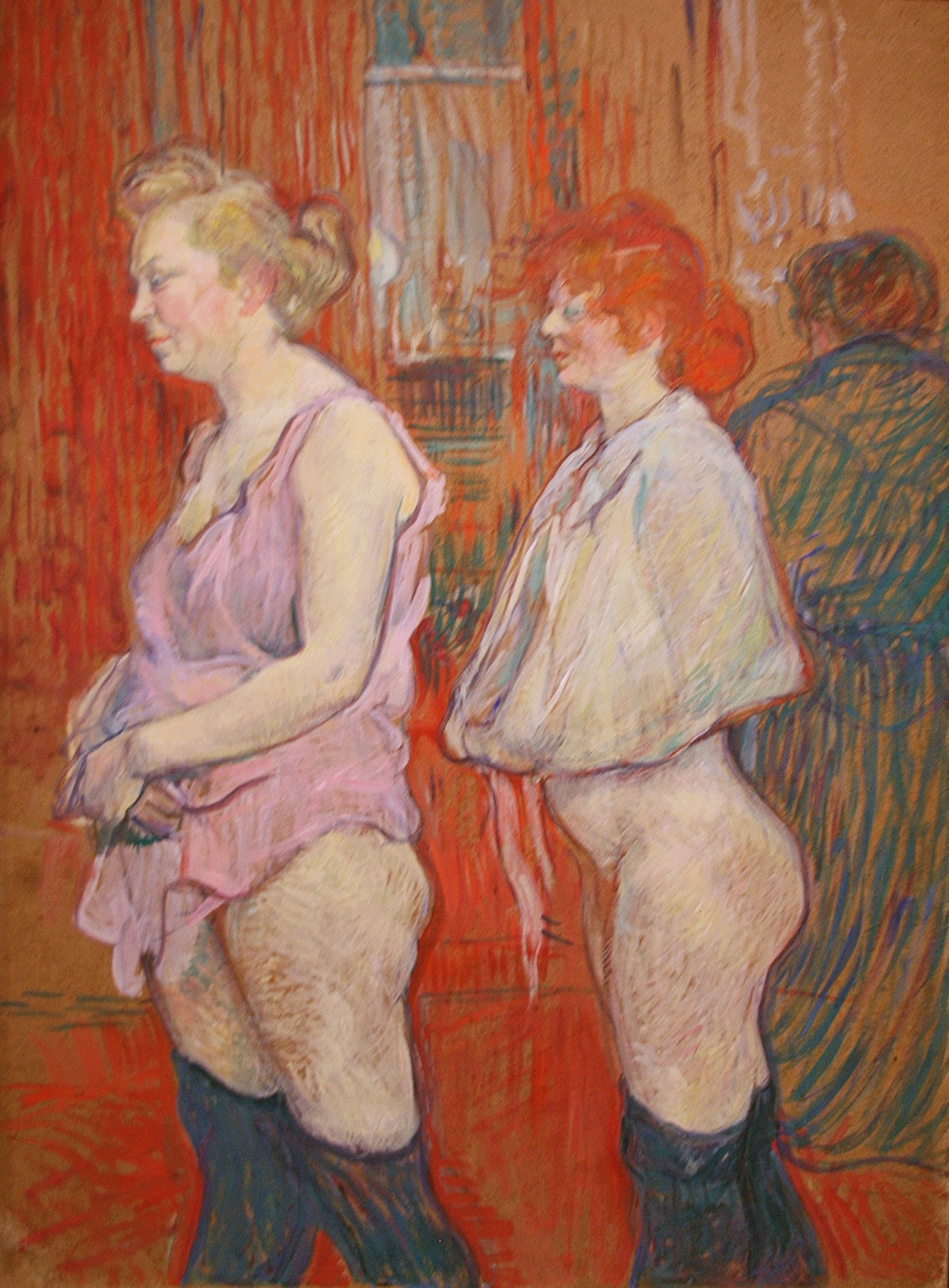
Rue des Moulins ("The Medical Inspection"), 1894, National Gallery of Art

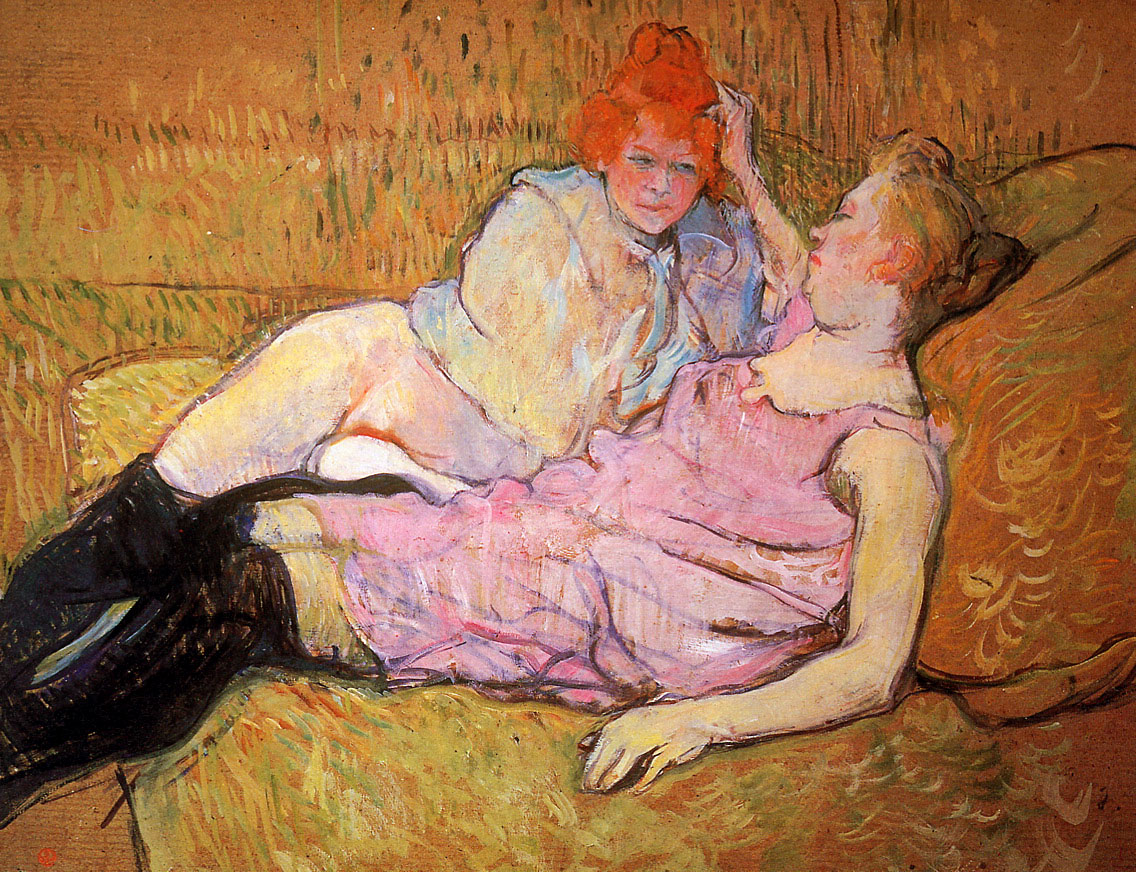
Le Sofa, 1895, Metropolitan Museum of Art
