= Francis Davis Millet =

American painter and sculptor (1848–1912)

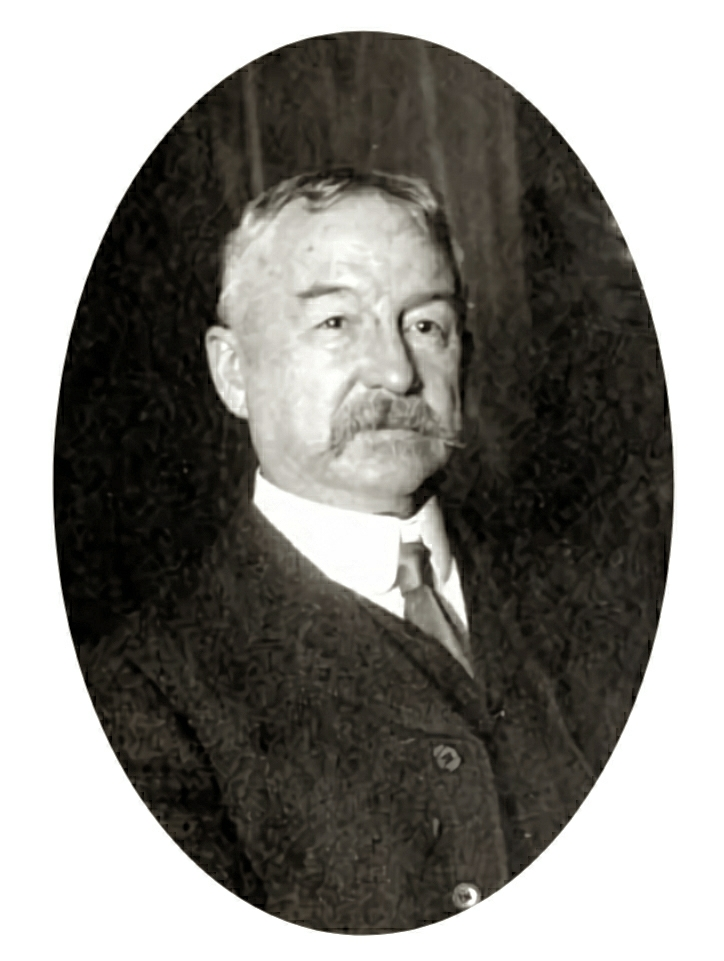
- Photographed circa 1910
- Born: October 3, 1846; Mattapoisett, Massachusetts, U.S.
- Died: April 15, 1912 (aged 65); Atlantic Ocean
- Other name: Frank Millet
- Occupations: Painter; sculptor
- Spouse: Elizabeth Merrill (m. 1879)
- Children: 4

Signature
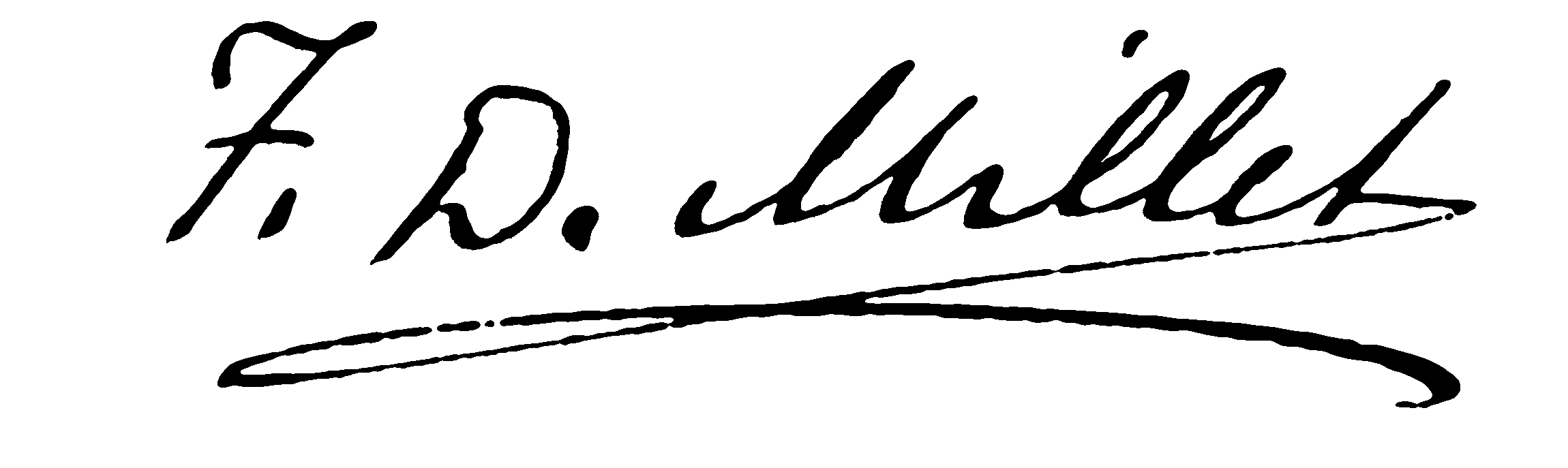

Francis Davis Millet (October 3, 1846 – April 15, 1912) was an American academic classical painter, sculptor, and writer who died in the sinking of the RMS Titanic.

== Early life ==
Francis Davis Millet was born in Mattapoisett, Massachusetts. Most sources give his date of birth as November 3, 1846, but a diary which he kept during his military service stated that November 3, 1864 was his 16th birthday, suggesting his year of birth was 1848. His actual Commonwealth of Massachusetts birth certificate confirms the correct date as being October 3rd, 1846. At age fifteen, Millet entered the 60th Massachusetts Infantry, first as a drummer and then a surgical assistant (helping his father, a surgeon) in the American Civil War.

He repeatedly pointed to his experience working for his father as giving him an appreciation for the vivid blood red that he frequently used in his early paintings. Millet graduated from Harvard with a Master of Arts degree. He worked as a reporter and editor for the Boston Courier and then as a correspondent for the Advertiser at the Philadelphia Centennial Exposition.

== Career ==
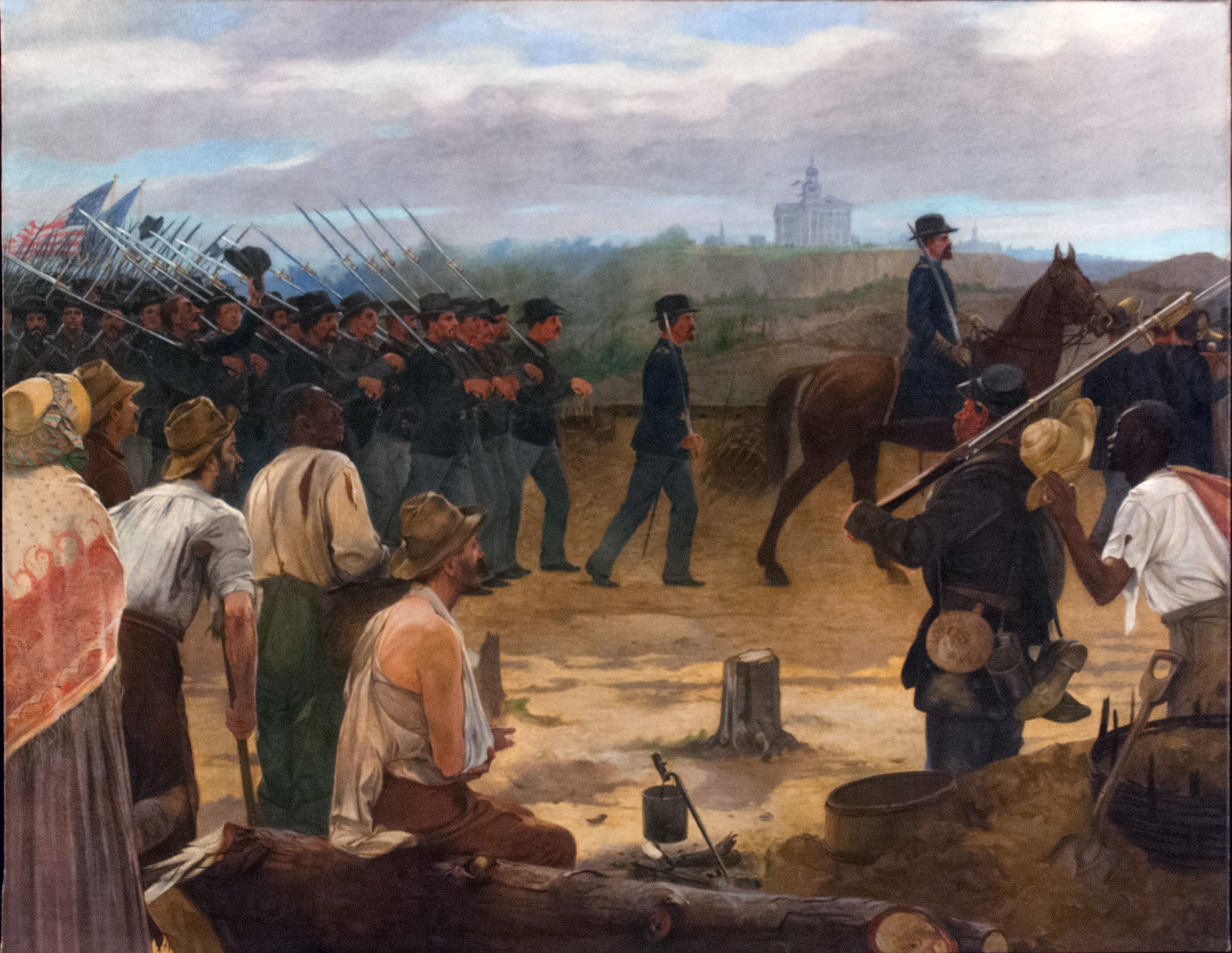
The Fourth Minnesota Entering Vicksburg, c. 1904, Governor's Reception Room at the Minnesota State Capitol

In 1876, Millet returned to Boston to paint murals at Trinity Church in Boston with John LaFarge. He entered the Royal Academy of Fine Arts at Antwerp, Belgium. He was the first student to win a silver medal in his first year; the following year he won a gold medal. In the Russo‐Turkish war of 1877–78, he was engaged as a war correspondent by the New York Herald, the London Daily News, and the London Graphic. He was decorated by Russia and Romania for his bravery under fire and his services to the wounded.

Millet became a member of the Society of American Artists in 1880, and in 1885 was elected as a member of the National Academy of Design, New York and as vice-chairman of the Fine Arts Committee. He was made a trustee of the Metropolitan Museum of Art, and sat on the advisory committee of the National Gallery of Art. He was decorations director for the World's Columbian Exposition in Chicago in 1893, with claims he invented the first form of compressed air spraypainting to apply whitewash to the buildings, but the story may be apocryphal as contemporary journals note spraypainting had already been in use since the early 1880s. His career included work on a number of worlds' fairs, including Vienna, Chicago, Paris, and Tokyo, where he made contributions as a juror, administrator, mural painter/decorator, and adviser.

Millet was among the founders of the School of the Museum of Fine Arts, Boston, and was influential in the early days of the American Federation of Arts. He was instrumental in obtaining the appointment of Emil Otto Grundmann, an old acquaintance from his Antwerp days, as first head of the school. Millet was involved with the American Academy in Rome from its inception and served as secretary from 1904 to 1911. He was a founding member and vice chairman of the U.S. Commission of Fine Arts, serving from 1910 until his death in 1912. He died aboard the Titanic while traveling to New York City on Academy business.

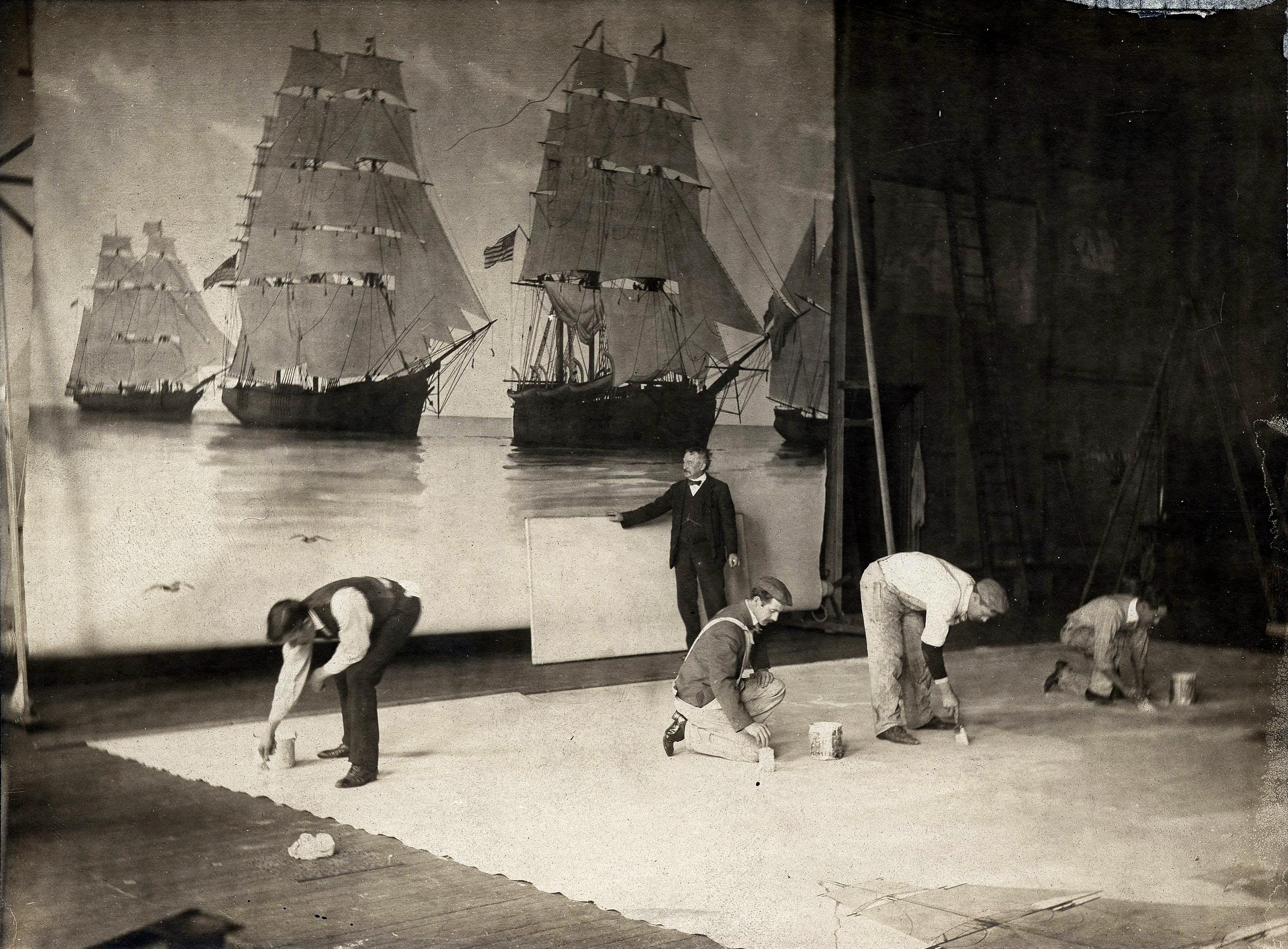
Millet at work in his studio, c. 1900

As well as an artist, Millet was a writer and journalist. He translated Tolstoy and also wrote essays and short stories. Among his publications are Capillary Crime and Other Stories (1892), The Danube From the Black Forest to the Black Sea (1892) and Expedition to the Philippines (1899). He was elected a member of the American Academy of Arts and Letters and was an honorary member of the American Institute of Architects.

A noted sculptor and designer, Millet designed the 1907 Civil War Medal at the request of the U.S. Army and United States War Department and the 1908 Spanish Campaign Medal. He executed the ceiling of the Call Room of the US Custom House at Baltimore, Maryland.

== Personal life ==
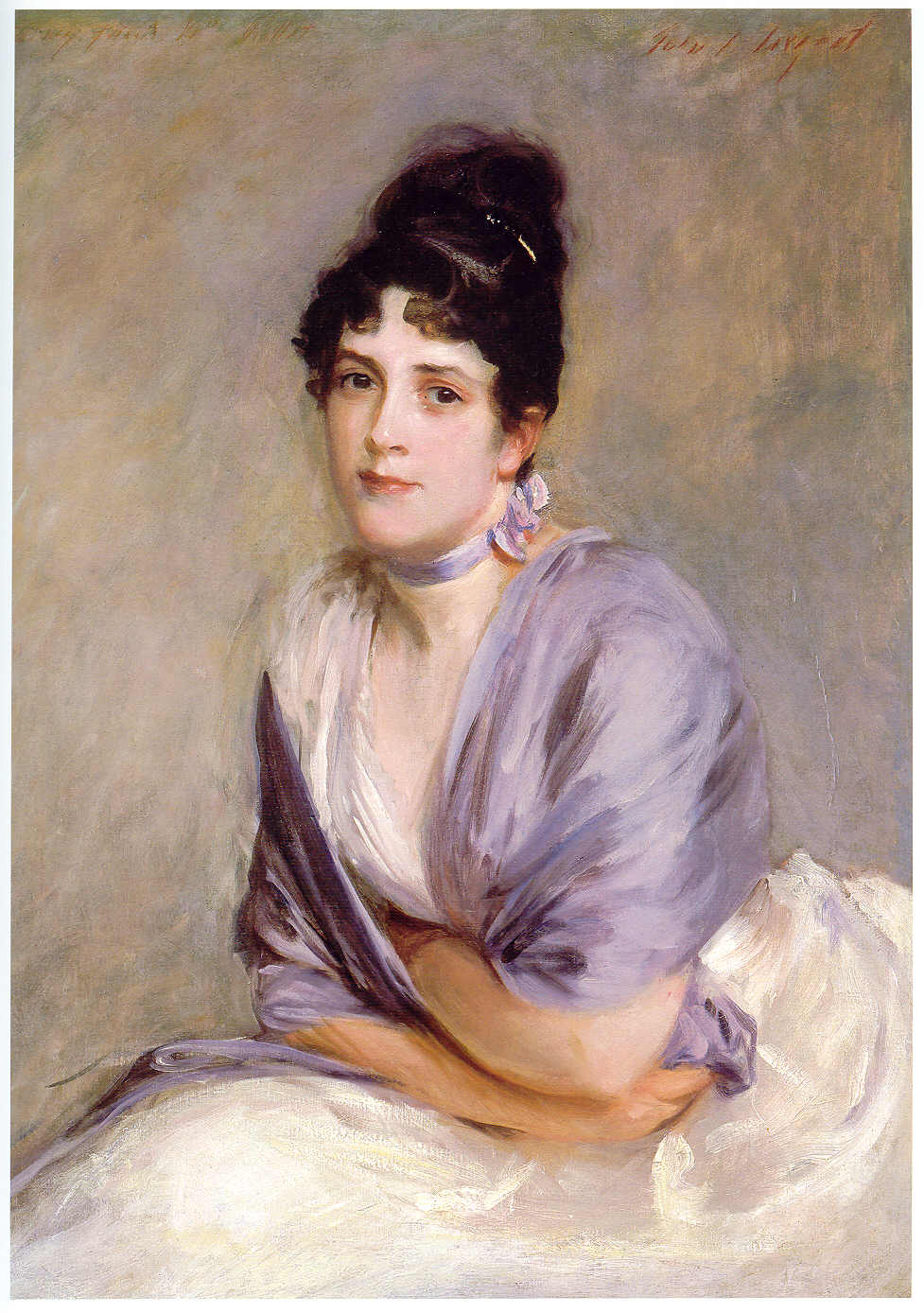
Mrs Frank Millet ("Lily", née Elizabeth Merrill), John Singer Sargent, 1885–1886

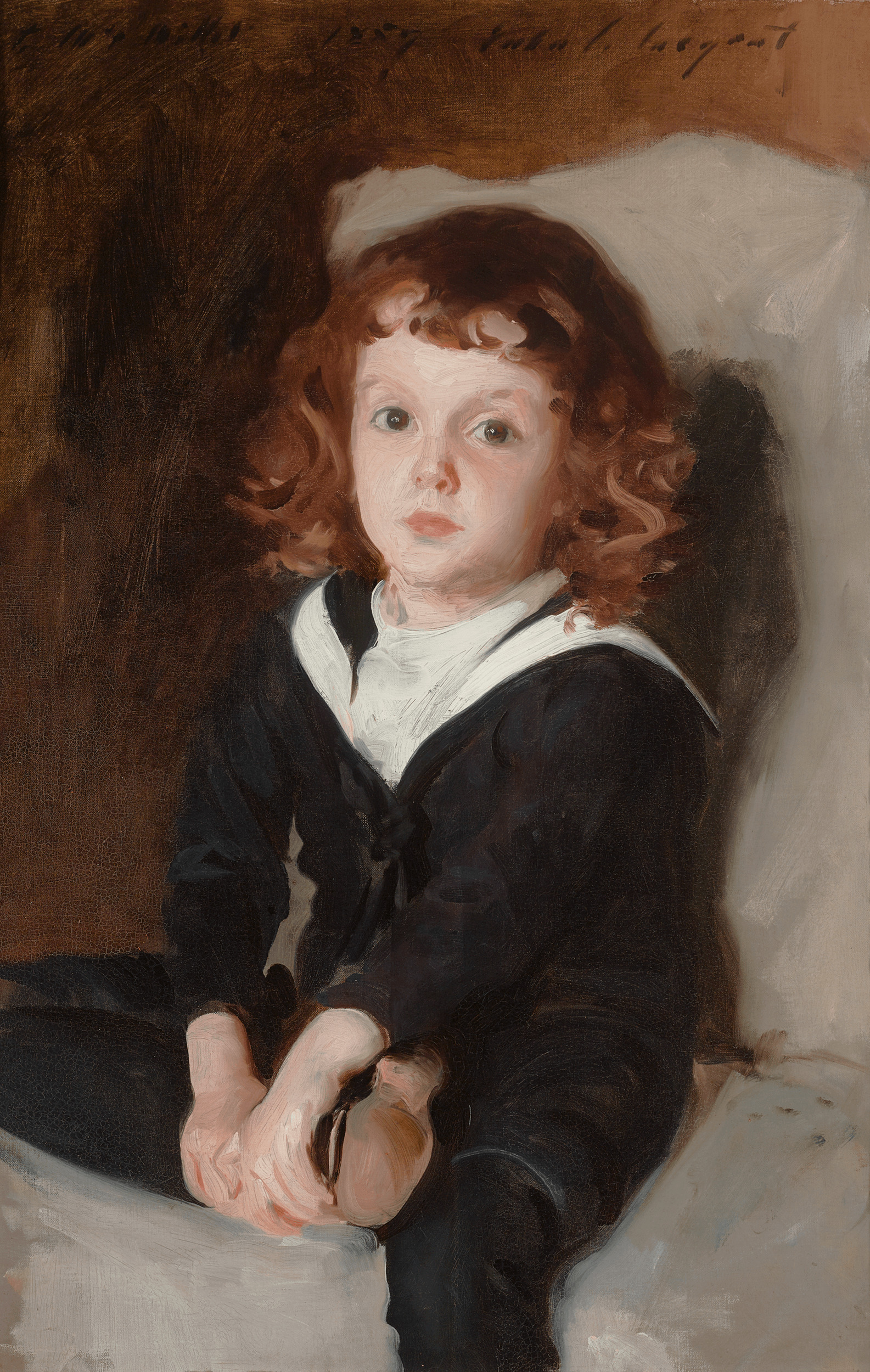
Portrait of Laurence Millet, John Singer Sargent, 1887

Millet was close friends with Augustus Saint-Gaudens and Mark Twain, both of whom attended his 1879 wedding to Elizabeth ("Lily") Greely Merrill in Paris, France; Twain was Millet's best man. The couple had four children: Kate, Edwin, Laurence, and John.

Millet was acquainted with the famed American portraitist John Singer Sargent, who often used Millet's daughter Kate as a model. He was also close to the esteemed Huxley family.

Millet lived with Archibald Butt, an army officer twenty years younger than Millet, who called him "my artist friend who lives with me," in a large mansion at 2000 G Street NW. They were known for throwing large but spartan parties that were attended by members of Congress, justices of the Supreme Court, and President Taft himself. There is some speculation that Butt and Millet were lovers. Historian Richard Davenport-Hines wrote in 2012:

"The enduring partnership of Butt and Millet was an early case of 'Don't ask, don't tell.' Washington insiders tried not to focus too closely on the men's relationship, but they recognized their mutual affection. And they were together in death as in life."

The possibility of Butt and Millet being lovers is also explored in the article "The Sublime Sewer Club" published in the Gay & Lesbian Review by historian and professor William Benneman.

== Death ==
On April 10, 1912, Millet boarded the RMS Titanic at Cherbourg, France, bound for New York City. He was traveling with Archibald Butt. Millet was last seen helping women and children into lifeboats. His body was recovered after the sinking by the cable boat Mackay-Bennett and returned to East Bridgewater, Massachusetts, where he was buried in Central Cemetery.

== Memorials ==
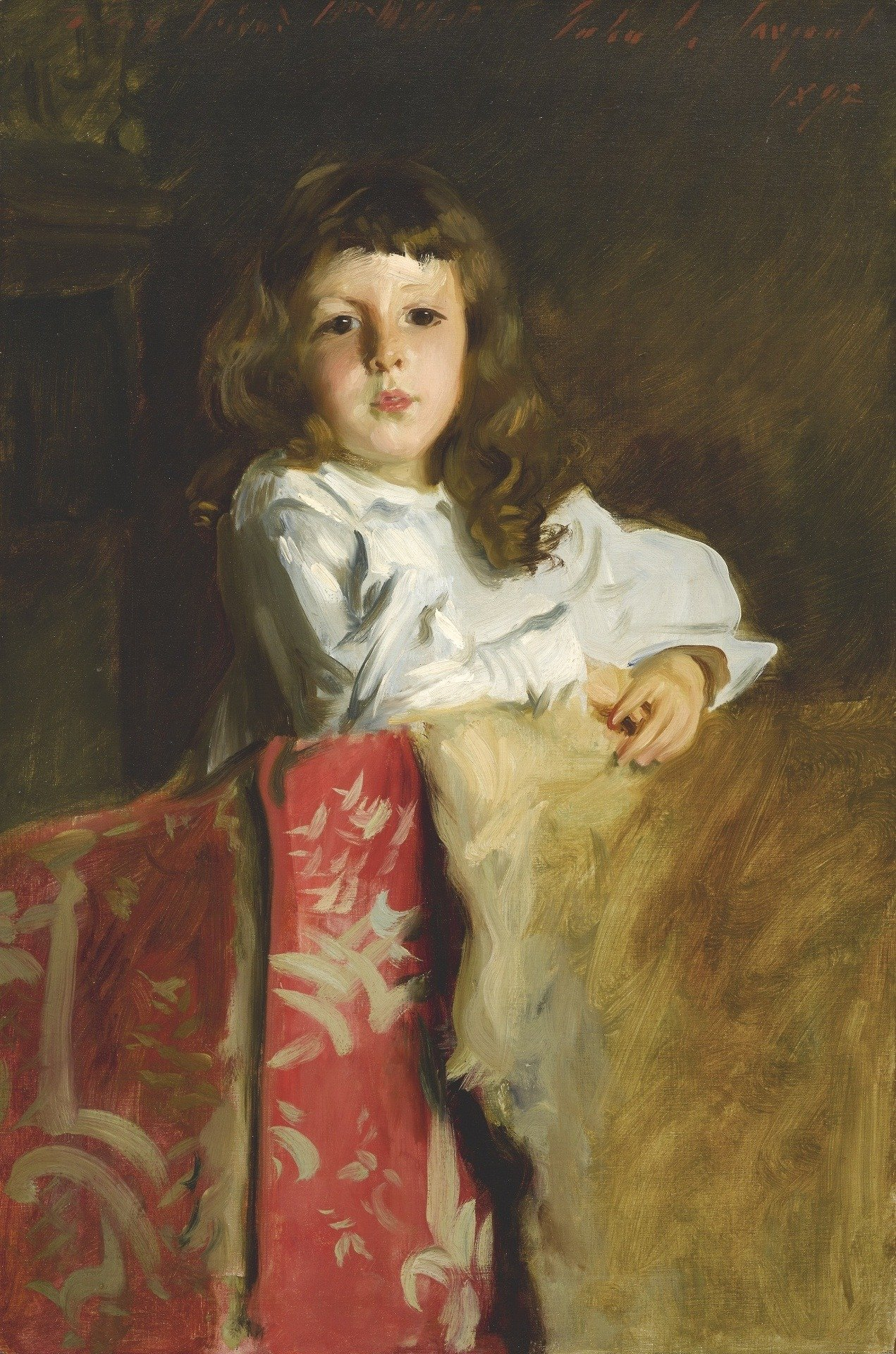
John Alfred Parsons Millet, John Singer Sargent, 1892, Frank Millet's youngest son named after two of his close friends: John Singer Sargent and Alfred Parsons.

In 1913, the Butt-Millet Memorial Fountain was erected in Washington, D.C., in memory of Millet and Butt. A bronze bust in Harvard University's Widener Library also memorializes Millet.

In 2015, his murals were exhibited in Cleveland Ohio.

== Gallery ==
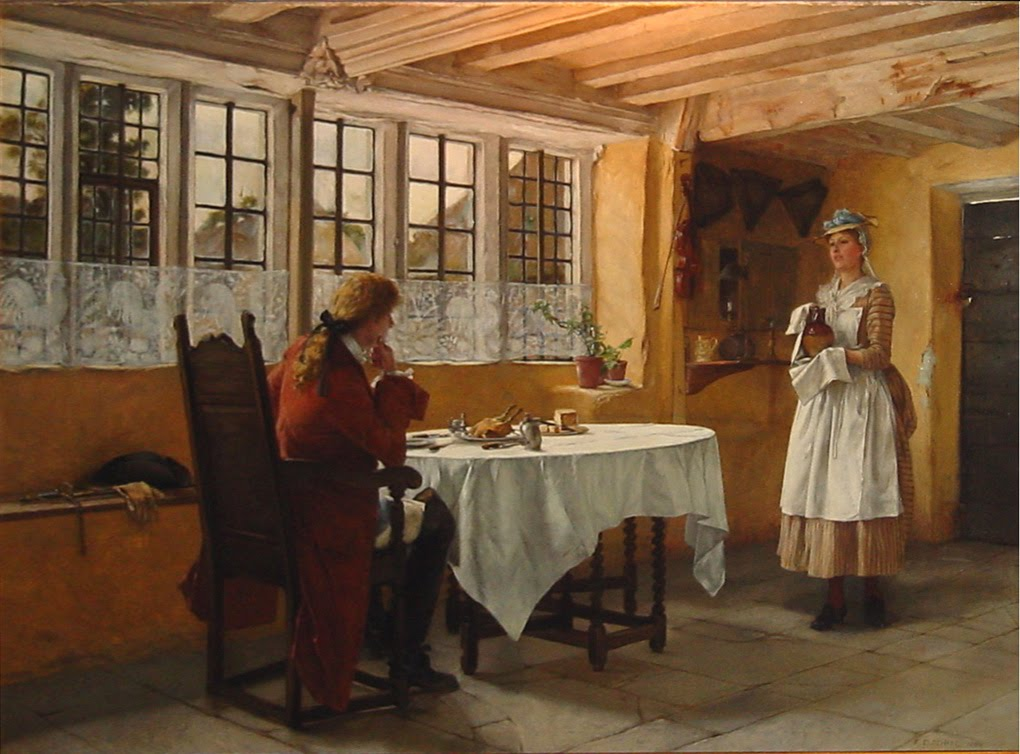
At the Inn, 1884, Union League Club, New York. Oil on canvas 25" × 30".

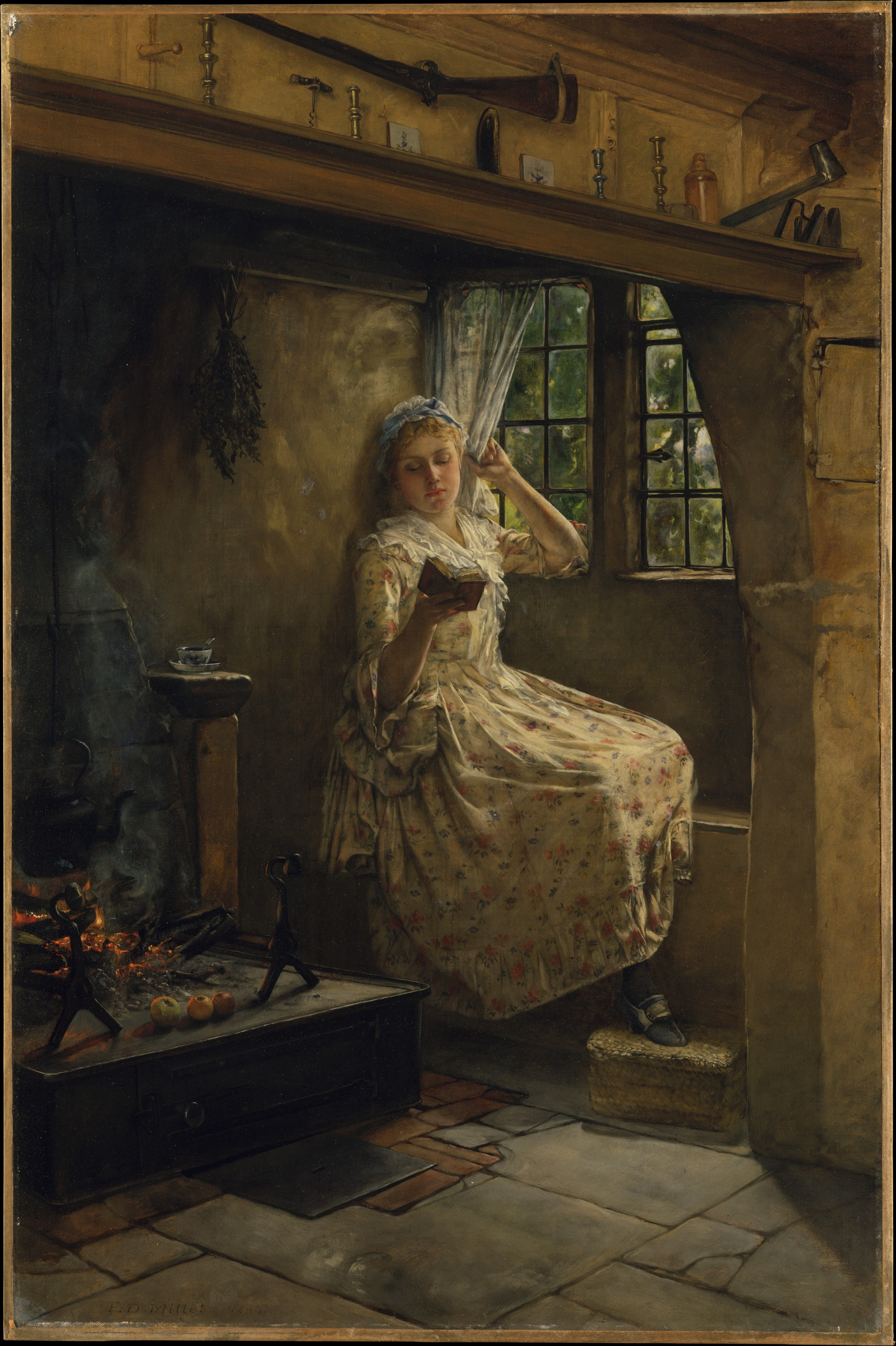
A Cosey Corner, 1884, Metropolitan Museum of Art.

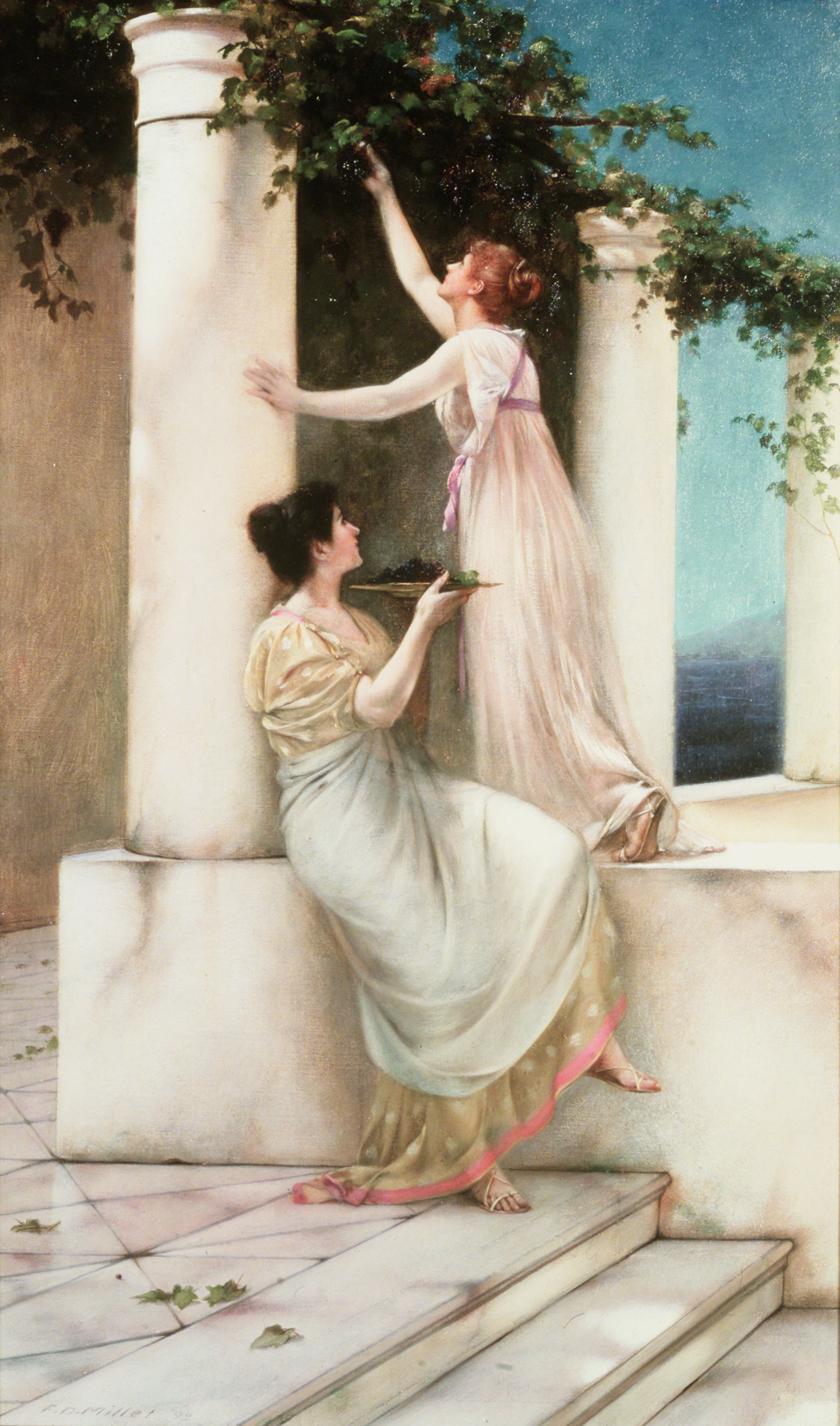
An Autumn Idyll, 1892, The Brooklyn Museum.

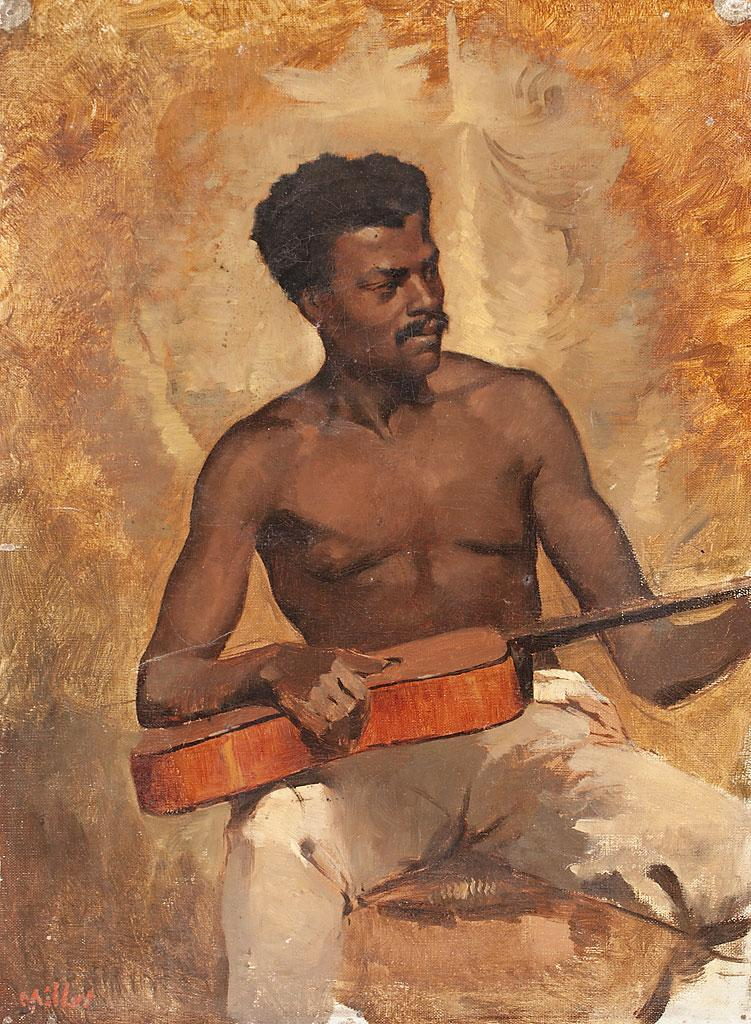
The Guitarist/Music in New Orleans. Oil on canvas 16" × 11 5/8". Private collection, Stawell, Australia

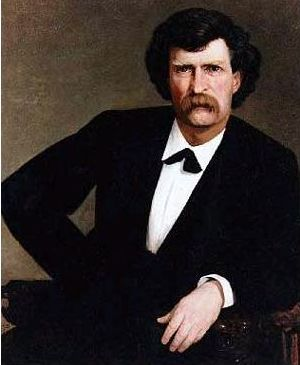
Portrait of Samuel L Clemens (Mark Twain), 1877. Free Public Library, Hannibal, Missouri.

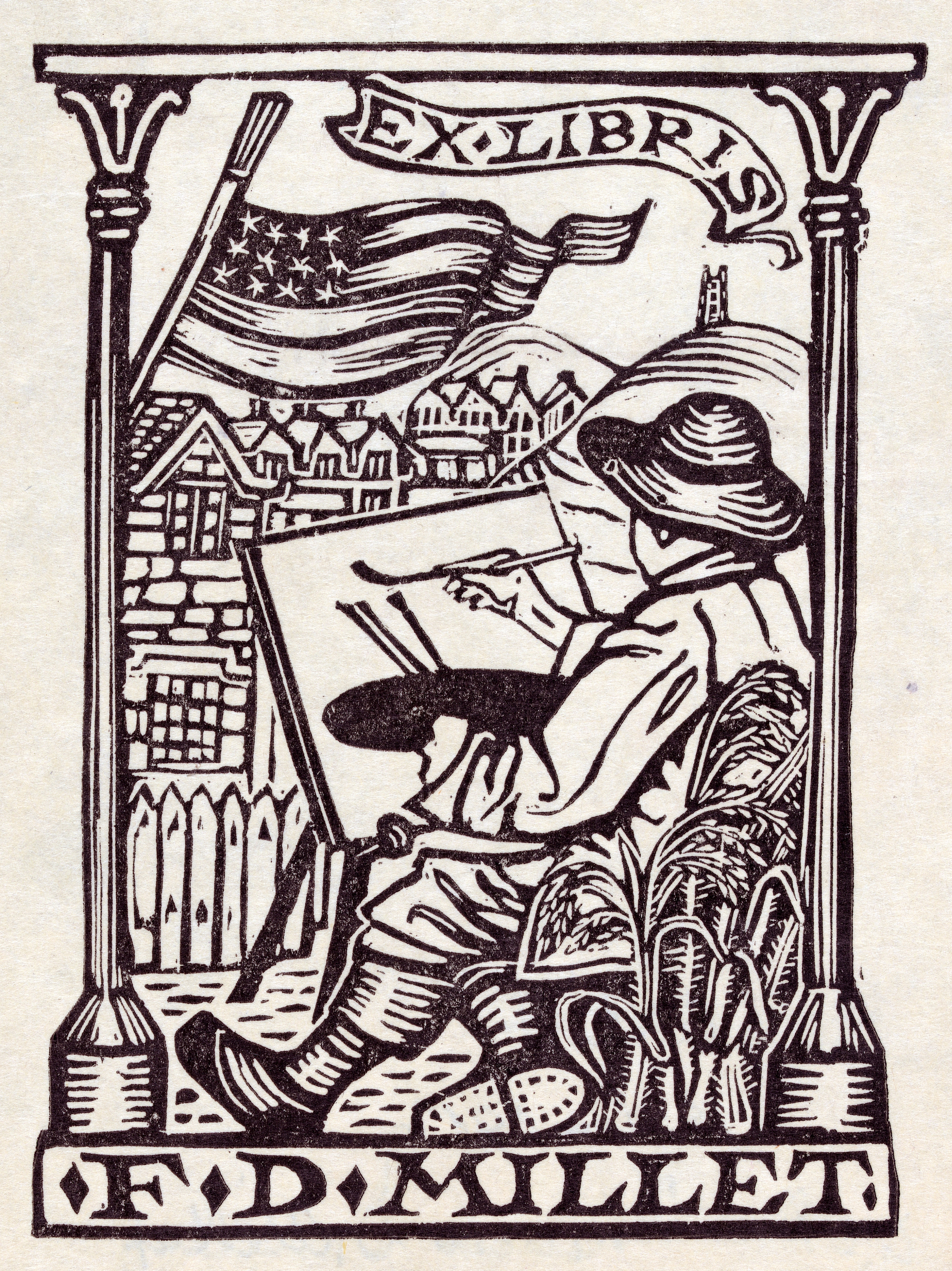
Bookplate of Francis Davis Millet.

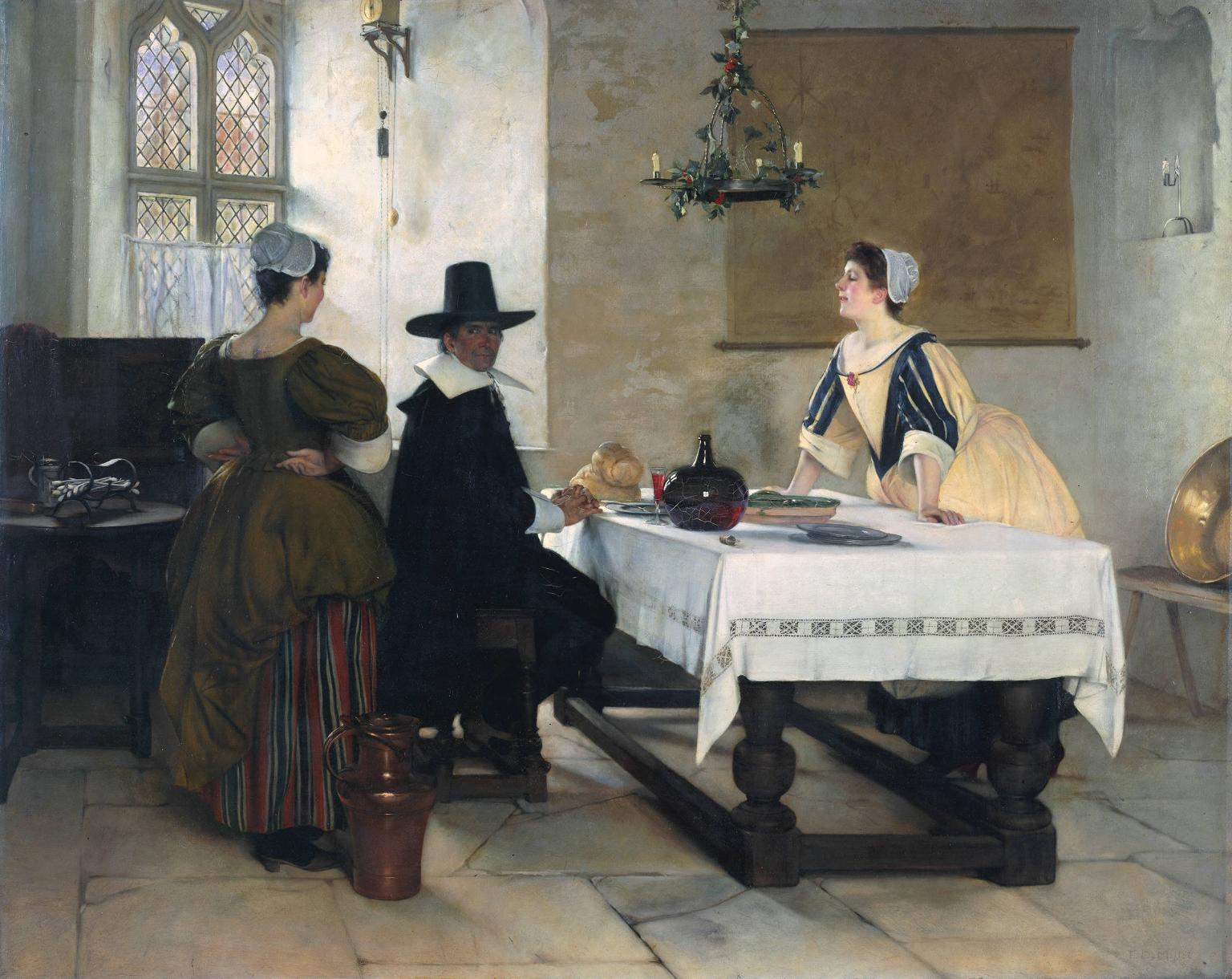
Between Two Fires, 1892. Oil on canvas 36" × 29" Tate Gallery, London.

== See also ==
- The Devil in the White City
- Passengers of the RMS Titanic
- World's Columbian Exposition
