= Aha Oe Feii? =

1892 painting by Paul Gauguin

- What? Are You Jealous? (English)
- Artist: Paul Gauguin
- Year: 1892
- Medium: oil on canvas
- Dimensions: 66 cm × 89 cm (26 in × 35 in)
- Location: Pushkin Museum, Moscow

Aha Oe Feii? or What? Are You Jealous? (French: Eh quoi ! Tu es jalouse ?) is an oil-on-canvas painting by Paul Gauguin from 1892, based on a real-life episode during his stay on Tahiti which he later described in the diary Noa Noa: "On the shore two sisters are lying after bathing, in the graceful poses of resting animals; they speak of yesterday's love and tomorrow's conquests. The recollection causes them to quarrel, "What? Are you jealous?" Gauguin titled the painting in Tahitian language, Aha Oe Feii?, in the lower left corner of the canvas.

The painting evokes a sense of Pacific paradise in which sexual relations are playful and harmless. According to Professor Peter Toohey, "this jealousy is not the product of a threat to an exclusive sexual relationship or jilted love affair – it is the result of one of the sisters having enjoyed more sex than the other the night before". In a letter to his friend from 1892, Gauguin wrote about the painting: "I think this is the best of what I've made so far".

The painting is housed in the Pushkin Museum, Moscow, Russia.
