= Claude-Charles Bourgonnier =

French painter (1860–1921)

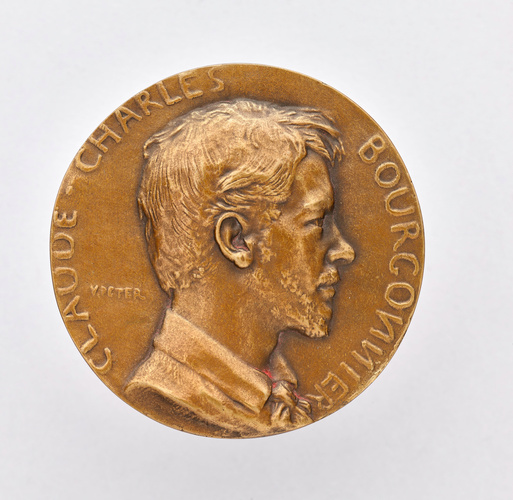
- 1881 portrait medal of Bourgonnier
- Born: 1860; Paris, French Empire
- Died: 15 June 1921 (aged 60–61); Agon-Coutainville, France
- Known for: Painting and lithography

Claude-Charles Bourgonnier (French: [klodʃaʁl buʁgɔnje]; 1860 – 15 June 1921) was a French painter and lithographer. He exhibited regularly at the Salon, a prominent art exhibition in Paris, and was a silver medalist at the 1900 Paris Exposition. He was also commissioned to decorate several buildings in France. In his time, Bourgonnier was described as a successful genre painter and praised for his technique and well-researched compositions.

== Biography ==
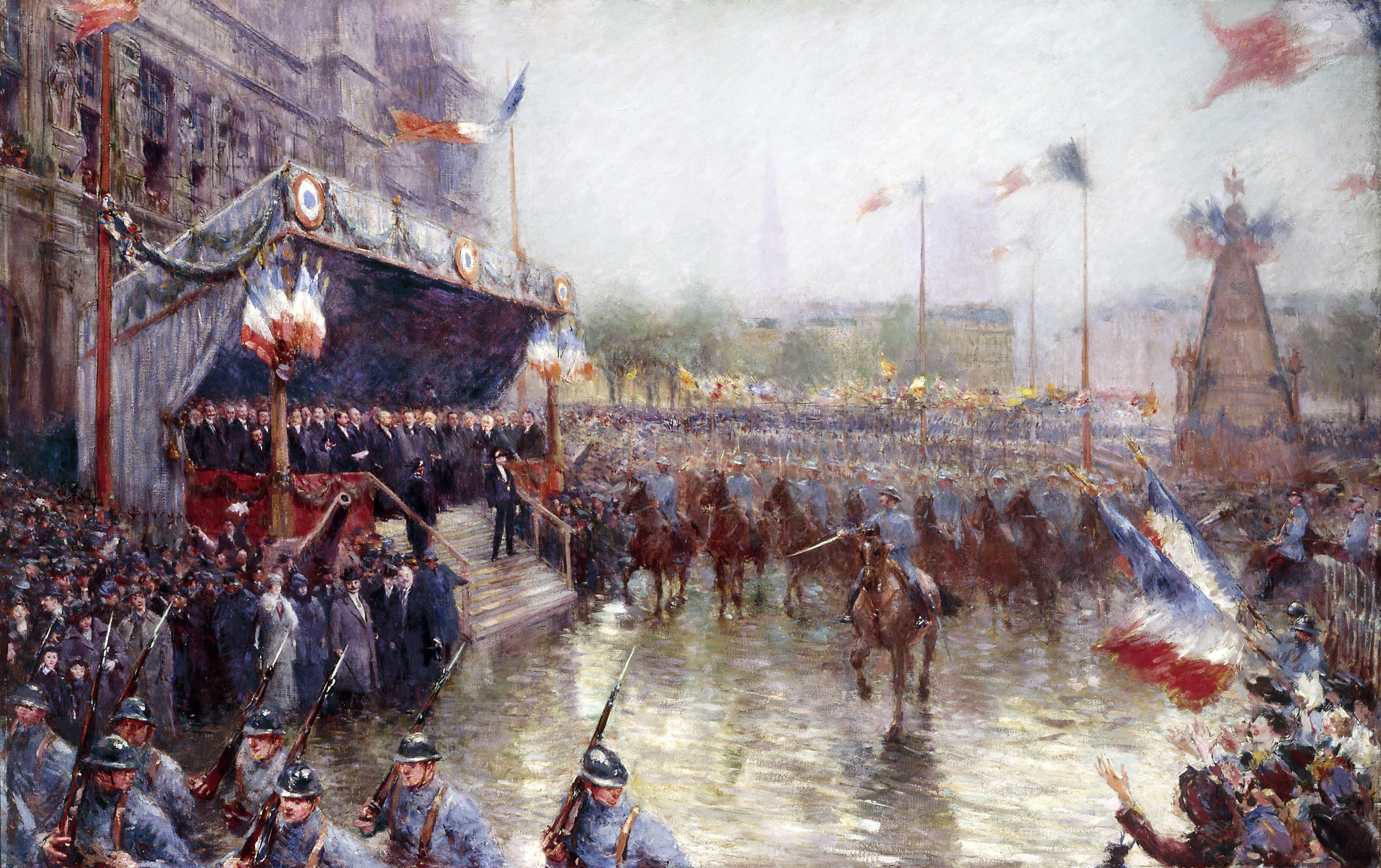
La place de l'Hôtel de Ville, le 20 octobre 1918 Manifestation en l'honneur de la classe 1920

Bourgonnier was born in Paris in 1860. He was a pupil of the painters Alexandre Cabanel, Alexandre Falguière, and Jean-François Millet. He made his debut at the Salon, a prominent Parisian art exhibition, in 1881 with a genre painting entitled La Cigale et La Fourmi (The Cicada and the Ant). He continued exhibiting his paintings at the Salon regularly thereafter. He received an honorable mention at the 1889 Paris Exposition and won medals for his work in 1890 and 1891, as well as a travel grant. In May 1892, Bourgonnier was barred from exhibiting art for a two-year period after tearing up one of his own paintings while it was on display. After his suspension, he won a silver medal at the 1900 Paris Exposition. In 1924, a writer described Bourgonnier as a successful genre painter and praised his technique and well-researched compositions.

In addition to his exhibited paintings, Bourgonnier was also commissioned to adorn the walls and ceilings of several buildings in France. For example, he painted a 54 m^{2} (580 sq ft) fresco on the ceiling of the Ecole Nationale de la France d'Outre-Mer's library, as well as a smaller 24 m^{2} (260 sq ft) panel in the same room. In 1892, Bourgonnier won a design competition for the wedding area in the city hall of Montreuil, defeating Henri Matisse and Maurice Denis. Bourgonnier also practiced lithography; some of his subjects include scenes from World War I and studies of women and children. Bourgonnier was married to Berthe Bourgonnier-Claude, who was also a painter. He died on 15 June 1921.
