= 1887 in art =

The year 1887 in art involved some significant events.

== Events ==
- February (approx.) – Fourth annual exhibition of Les XX, at the Royal Museums of Fine Arts of Belgium in Brussels. Artists invited to show in addition to members of the group include Walter Sickert, Camille Pissarro, Berthe Morisot and Georges-Pierre Seurat. The major work shown is Seurat's A Sunday Afternoon on the Island of La Grande Jatte.
- March 26 – June 8 – Third exhibition by the Société des Artistes Indépendants in Paris.
- November 14 – Paul Gauguin and Charles Laval return to Paris from Martinique where they have been living since leaving Panama in June.
- December (approx.) – Vincent van Gogh arranges an exhibition of paintings by himself, Émile Bernard, Louis Anquetin, and (probably) Toulouse-Lautrec in the Restaurant du Chalet, 43 Avenue de Clichy, Montmartre, Paris. Bernard and Anquetin sell their first paintings; van Gogh exchanges work with Gauguin.
- Vincent van Gogh begins his first Sunflowers series of paintings in Paris.
- Walter Crane illustrates "The Architecture of Art" (included in his Claims of Decorative Art, printed later).
- Charles Lang Freer's first Asian art purchase is a painted Japanese fan.
- Sir John Everett Millais' painting Bubbles is acquired for advertising purposes by Pears soap.

== Works ==
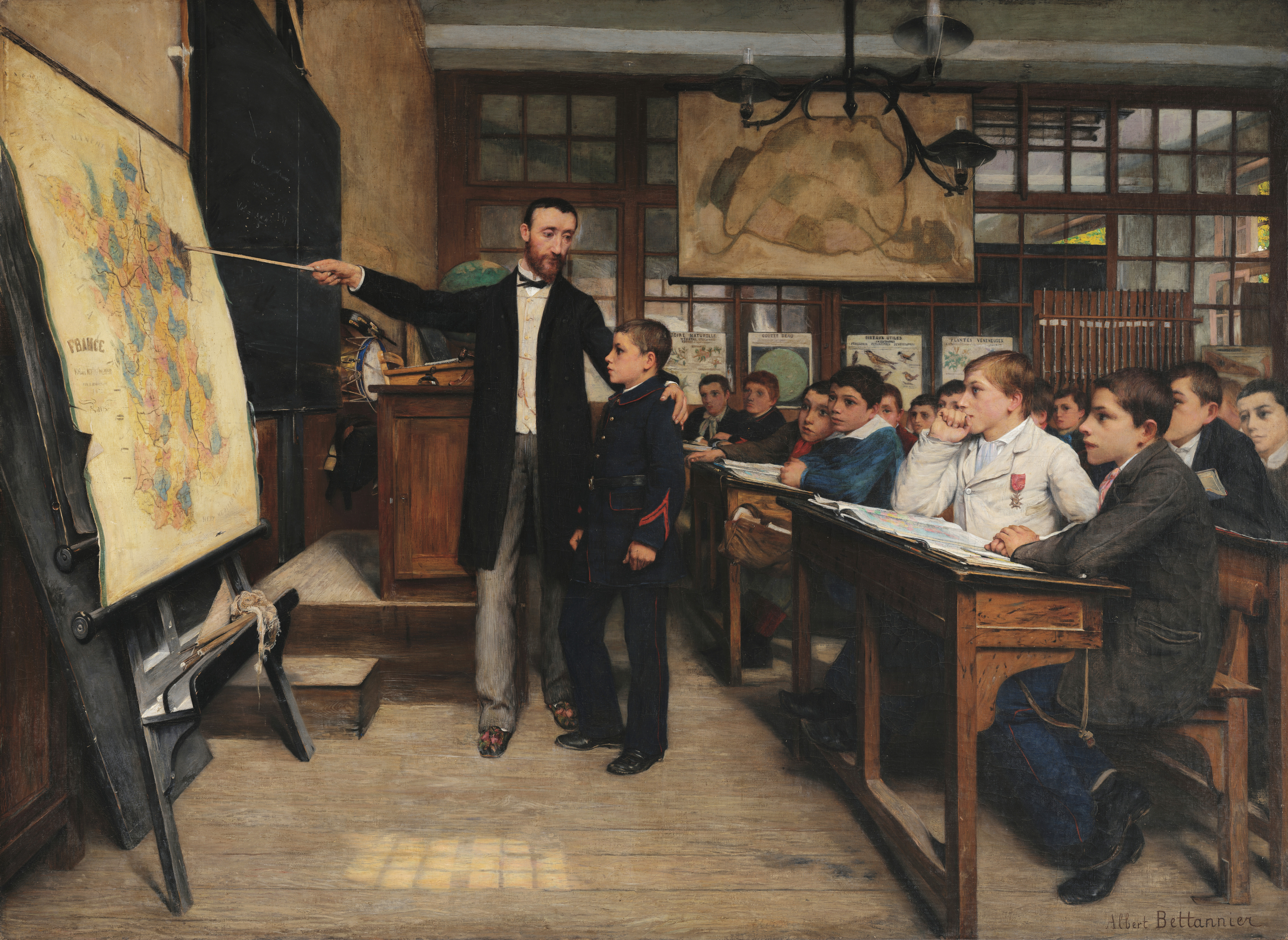
The Black Spot by Albert Bettannier

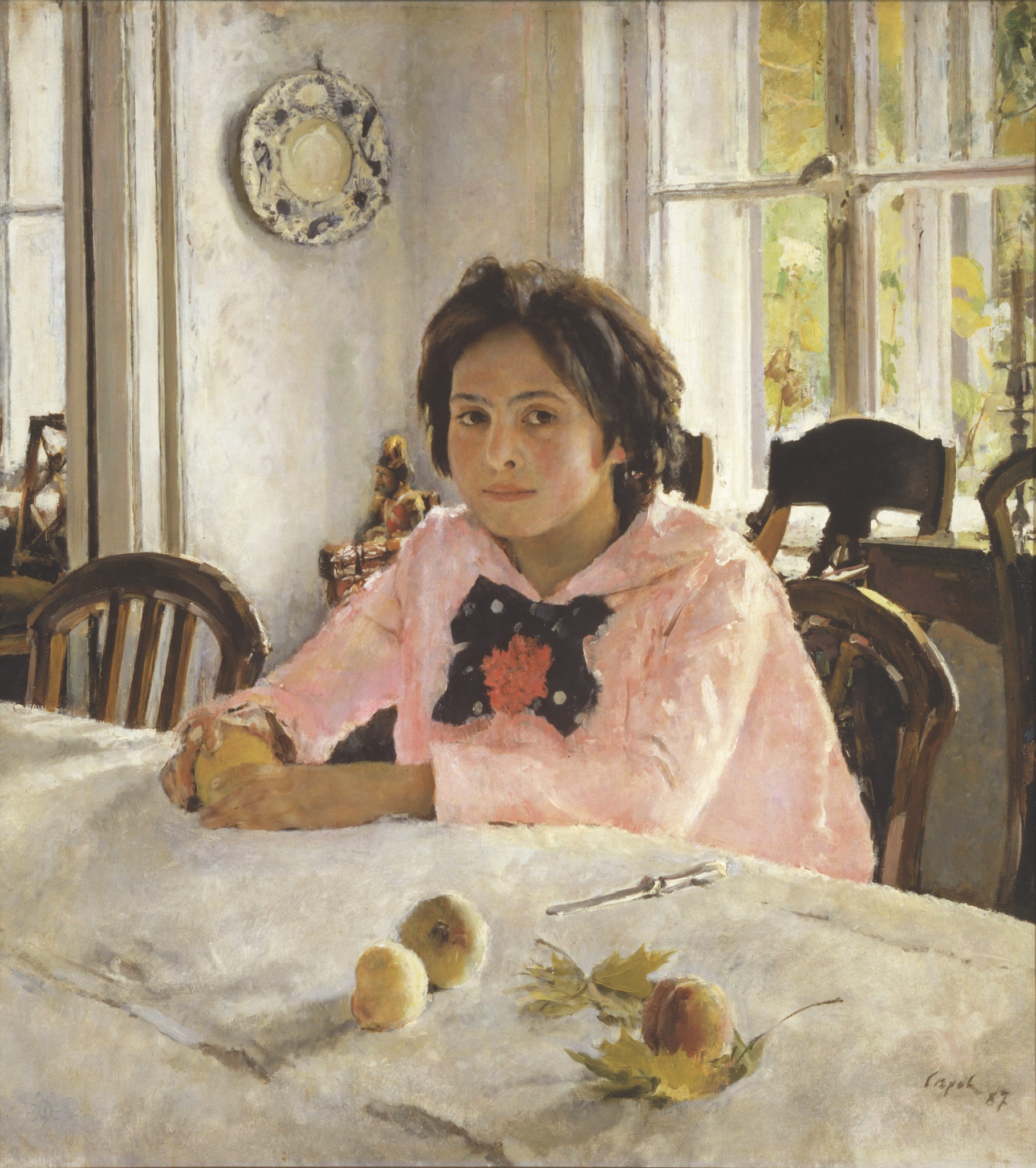
V. A. Serov – Girl with Peaches, inaugurating Russian Impressionism

- Atlanta Cyclorama (approximate completion date)
- Lawrence Alma-Tadema – The Women of Amphissa
- Otto Bache – Christian IV's Coronation, 1596
- William Gerard Barry – Time Flies
- Albert Bettannier – The Black Spot (La tache noire) (or The Geography Lesson)
- Anna Bilińska – Self-Portrait with Apron and Brushes
- Joseph Boehm – Jubilee Head of Queen Victoria on British coinage
- Alexander Milne Calder – Major General George Gordon Meade
- Thomas Shields Clarke – A Fool's Fool
- Pascal Dagnan-Bouveret – Breton Women at a Pardon
- Pierre Puvis de Chavannes – Young Girls at the Seaside
- Frank Duveneck – Elizabeth Boott Duveneck
- Jean-Léon Gérôme – Omphale (sculpture)
- Edward John Gregory – Marooned and Marooning
- Atkinson Grimshaw
  - Canny Glasgow
  - Liverpool Quay by Moonlight
  - Prince's Dock, Hull (later version, Ferens Art Gallery, Hull)
- Max Klinger – The Judgement of Paris (c. 1886–87)
- Léon Augustin Lhermitte – The Gleaners
- John Longstaff – Breaking the News
- Matthijs Maris – The Dreamer
- Albert Joseph Moore – Midsummer
- Walter Osborne – On Suffolk Sands
- Hanna Hirsch-Pauli – Breakfast Time (Frukostdags)
- Eilif Peterssen – Summer Evening and Nocturne
- Camille Pissarro – Late Afternoon in Our Meadow
- Edward Poynter – Corner of the Marketplace
- Pierre-Auguste Renoir – Les Grandes Baigneuses
- Ilya Repin – Portrait of Leo Nikolayevich Tolstoy
- Theodore Roussel – The Reading Girl
- Valentin Serov
  - Girl with Peaches («Девочка с персиками», Devochka s Persikami)
  - Self-portrait
- Paul Signac – The Town Beach, Collioure
- Solomon Joseph Solomon – Samson and Delilah
- Henri de Toulouse-Lautrec – A Montrouge–Rosa La Rouge
- Vincent van Gogh
  - Coin de Jardin avec Papillons
  - Crab on its Back
  - Portrait of Alexander Reid
- John William Waterhouse – Mariamne Leaving the Judgement Seat of Herod
- George Frederic Watts
  - Mrs. G. F. Watts
  - A Sea Ghost
- Henry Tanworth Wells – Victoria Regina (second version)
- Rome Confederate Monument

== Births ==
=== January to June ===
- January 3 – August Macke, German Expressionist painter (died on active service 1914).
- February 5 – Albert Paris Gütersloh, Austrian painter and writer (died 1973).
- March 23 – Juan Gris, Spanish painter and sculptor (died 1927).
- March 25 – Josef Čapek, Czech painter (died 1945).
- April 29 – Stanley Cursiter, Scottish painter and curator (died 1976).
- May – Jacob Steinhardt, German-born Israeli painter and woodcut artist (died 1968).
- May 12 – Leo Michelson, Latvian-American painter and sculptor (died 1978).
- May 16 – Laura Wheeler Waring, African-America painter (died 1948)
- May 21
  - Barker Fairley, English-born Canadian painter, writer, and educator (died 1986).
  - Paul Maze, French-born Post-Impressionist painter (died 1979).
- May 22 – Arthur Cravan, born Fabian Avenarius Lloyd, Swiss-born Dadaist writer, poet, artist and boxer (disappeared 1918)
- May 30 – Alexander Archipenko, Ukrainian sculptor (died 1964).
- June 20 – Kurt Schwitters, German Dadaist painter and writer (died 1948).

=== July to December ===
- July 7 – Marc Chagall, Russian-Belarusian-French painter (died 1985).
- July 28 – Marcel Duchamp, French-American artist and inventor (died 1968).
- August 31 – William McMillan, Scottish sculptor (died 1977).
- September 24 – Frank Newbould, English poster artist (died 1951).
- October 6 – Le Corbusier, French architect and painter (died 1965).
- October 9 – Manuel Ortíz de Zárate, Chilean painter (died 1946).
- October 13 – Kate Lechmere, English painter associated with the Vorticists and milliner (died 1976).
- November 1 – L. S. Lowry, English painter (died 1976).
- November 14 – Amadeo de Souza Cardoso, Portuguese painter (died 1918).
- November 15 – Georgia O'Keeffe, American painter (died 1986).
- December 14 – Xul Solar, Argentine painter, sculptor and writer (died 1963).
- December 29 – Nell Walden, Swedish-born abstract artist and collector (died 1975)

== Deaths ==
- March 24 – Ivan Kramskoi, painter and art critic (born 1837)
- May 20 – Paul Emile Chappuis, photographer (born 1816)
- June 4 – Albert-Ernest Carrier-Belleuse, French sculptor and painter (born 1824)
- June 5 – Hans von Marées, painter (born 1837)
- July 8 – John Wright Oakes, landscape painter (born 1820)
- July 17 – Nicaise de Keyser, painter (born 1813)
- August 19 – Alvan Clark, American astronomer, telescope maker, portrait painter and engraver (born 1804)
- December 19
  - August Becker, painter (born 1821)
  - François Bonvin, realist painter (born 1817)
- date unknown – Giovanni Battista Amendola, sculptor (born 1848)
