= Ferryman's Seat =

Resting place in London

Coordinates: 51.5082°N 0.0956°W

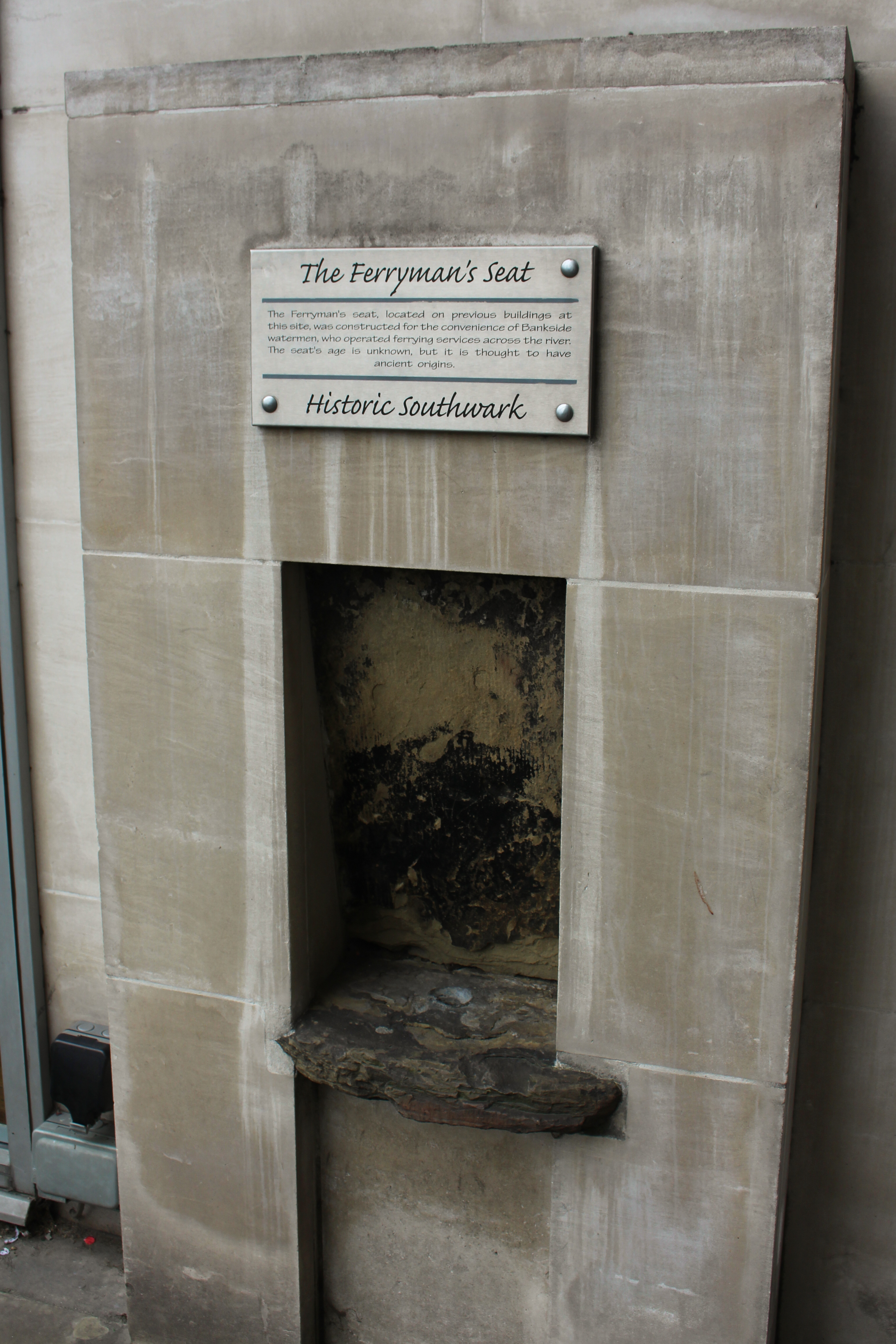
Ferryman's seat in 2015

The Ferryman's Seat is the last remaining example of the boatmen's perches that once dotted the south bank of the Thames in Southwark, London.

== Location ==
Situated within the wall of what is now a restaurant in London's Bankside on the southern bank of the Thames, is a slab of stone. It is located west of Southwark Bridge near Shakespeare's Globe and marks the last remaining example of the ferryman seats that once dotted Thames's South Bank, an early illustration of London's premier cab rank and also its last.

== Description ==
The seat itself is constructed out of flint. Though its age is undetermined, it's thought to have ancient origins, either from the 12th or 13th century.

In the stone plaque the following sentence can be read:

"The Ferryman's seat located on previous buildings at this site was constructed for the convenience of Bankside watermen who operated ferrying services across the river. The seat's age is unknown but it is thought to have ancient origins."

- Historic Southwark

== History ==
Before 1750, The London Bridge was the sole means of crossing the Thames in and out of central London. Ferrymen, or "Wherrymen" as they were referred to, would shuttle commuters and commodities in confined water taxis, or "wherries." Stone seats lined the bank used as perches where the drivers could wait for passengers. It is very likely that notable citizens as William Shakespeare and Samuel Pepys would have been customers and utilized the services of these boatmen.

Back then, the south side of the Thames was seen as a lawless place filled with brothels (known then as "stews" because they doubled up as steam baths) and theatres. As a matter of fact, the seat is on a street called "Bear Gardens" named after the Davies Amphitheatre, the last bear-baiting pit in London.
