= Southwark Bridge =

Bridge in London

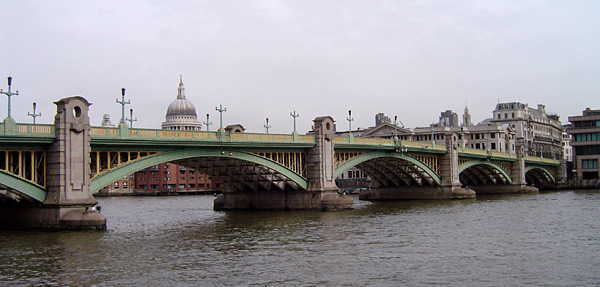
- Coordinates: 51°30′32″N 0°05′40″W
- Carries: A300 road
- Crosses: River Thames
- Locale: Southwark, London
- Maintained by: Bridge House Estates, City of London Corporation
- Heritage status: Grade II listed structure
- Preceded by: Millennium Bridge
- Followed by: Cannon Street Railway Bridge

Characteristics
- Total length: 800 feet (243.8 m)
- Width: 55 feet (16.8 m)
- Longest span: 240 feet (73.2 m)

History
- Opened: 6 June 1921; 104 years ago

Location
- Interactive map of Southwark Bridge

Southwark Bridge (/ˈsʌðərk/ SUDH-ərk) is an arch bridge in London, for traffic linking the district of Southwark and the City across the River Thames. Besides when others are closed for temporary repairs, it has the least traffic of the Thames bridges in London.

== History ==
Southwark Bridge Act 1811
- Act of Parliament
- Parliament of the United Kingdom
- Long title: An Act for erecting a Bridge over the River Thames from or near the Three Cranes in the Parishes of Saint James Garlick Hythe and Saint Martin Vintry, in the City of London, to the opposite Bank of the said River, in the Parish of Saint Saviour, in the County of Surrey; and for making proper Streets and Avenues to communicate therewith.
- Citation: 51 Geo. 3. c. clxvi

Dates
- Royal assent: 15 June 1811

Other legislation
- Amended by: Southwark Bridge 1813; Southwark Bridge 1816; Southwark Bridge Act 1820; Southwark Bridge Act 1823; Southwark Bridge Approaches Act 1824; Southwark Bridge Approaches Act 1828

Status: Amended

Text of statute as originally enacted

Southwark Bridge Act 1813
- Act of Parliament
- Parliament of the United Kingdom
- Long title: An Act to amend an Act, passed in the Fifty first Year of His present Majesty, for erecting a Bridge over the River Thames, from the City of London to the opposite Bank in the Parish of Saint Saviour, in the County of Surry.
- Citation: 53 Geo. 3. c. lxxxvii

Dates
- Royal assent: 21 May 1813

Other legislation
- Amends: Southwark Bridge Act 1811
- Amended by: Southwark Bridge Approaches Act 1828

Status: Amended

Text of statute as originally enacted

Southwark Bridge Act 1816
- Act of Parliament
- Parliament of the United Kingdom
- Long title: An Act to amend Two Acts of His present Majesty for erecting a Bridge over the River Thames, from the City of London to the opposite Bank in the County of Surrey.
- Citation: 56 Geo. 3. c. xi

Dates
- Royal assent: 11 April 1816

Other legislation
- Amends: Southwark Bridge Act 1811
- Amended by: Southwark Bridge Approaches Act 1828

Status: Amended

Text of statute as originally enacted

Southwark Bridge Act 1818
- Act of Parliament
- Parliament of the United Kingdom
- Long title: An Act for enabling the Southwark Bridge Company to raise a further Sum of Money, and to amend the Acts for building the said Bridge.
- Citation: 58 Geo. 3. c. lxviii

Dates
- Royal assent: 23 May 1818

Other legislation
- Amended by: Southwark Bridge Approaches Act 1828

Status: Amended

Text of statute as originally enacted

Southwark Bridge Act 1820
- Act of Parliament
- Parliament of the United Kingdom
- Long title: An Act to alter and amend several Acts for erecting a Bridge over the River Thames from the City of London to the opposite Bank in the County of Surrey.
- Citation: 1 Geo. 4. c. xlix

Dates
- Royal assent: 8 July 1820

Other legislation
- Amends: Southwark Bridge Act 1811
- Amended by: Southwark Bridge Act 1823; Southwark Bridge Approaches Act 1828

Status: Amended

Text of statute as originally enacted

Southwark Bridge Act 1823
- Act of Parliament
- Parliament of the United Kingdom
- Long title: An Act to amend several Acts for erecting a Bridge over the River Thames, from the City of London to the opposite Bank in the Parish of Saint Saviour in the County of Surrey.
- Citation: 4 Geo. 4. c. cxvi

Dates
- Royal assent: 27 June 1823

Other legislation
- Amends: Southwark Bridge Act 1811; Southwark Bridge Act 1820
- Amended by: Southwark Bridge Approaches Act 1828

Status: Amended

Text of statute as originally enacted

Southwark Bridge Approaches Act 1824
- Act of Parliament
- Parliament of the United Kingdom
- Long title: An Act to amend the Acts relating to the Southwark Bridge.
- Citation: 5 Geo. 4. c. clv

Dates
- Royal assent: 24 June 1824

Other legislation
- Amends: Southwark Bridge Act 1811
- Amended by: Southwark Bridge Approaches Act 1828

Status: Amended

Southwark Bridge Approaches Act 1828
- Act of Parliament
- Parliament of the United Kingdom
- Long title: An Act to authorize the Relinquishment of the Care and Management of a Road set out by the Southwark Bridge Company to the Trustees of the Surrey and Sussex Roads.
- Citation: 9 Geo. 4. c. cxi

Dates
- Royal assent: 19 June 1828

Other legislation
- Amends: Southwark Bridge Act 1811; Southwark Bridge Act 1813; Southwark Bridge Act 1816; Southwark Bridge Act 1818; Southwark Bridge Act 1820; Southwark Bridge Act 1823; Southwark Bridge Approaches Act 1824

Status: Current legislation

Text of statute as originally enacted

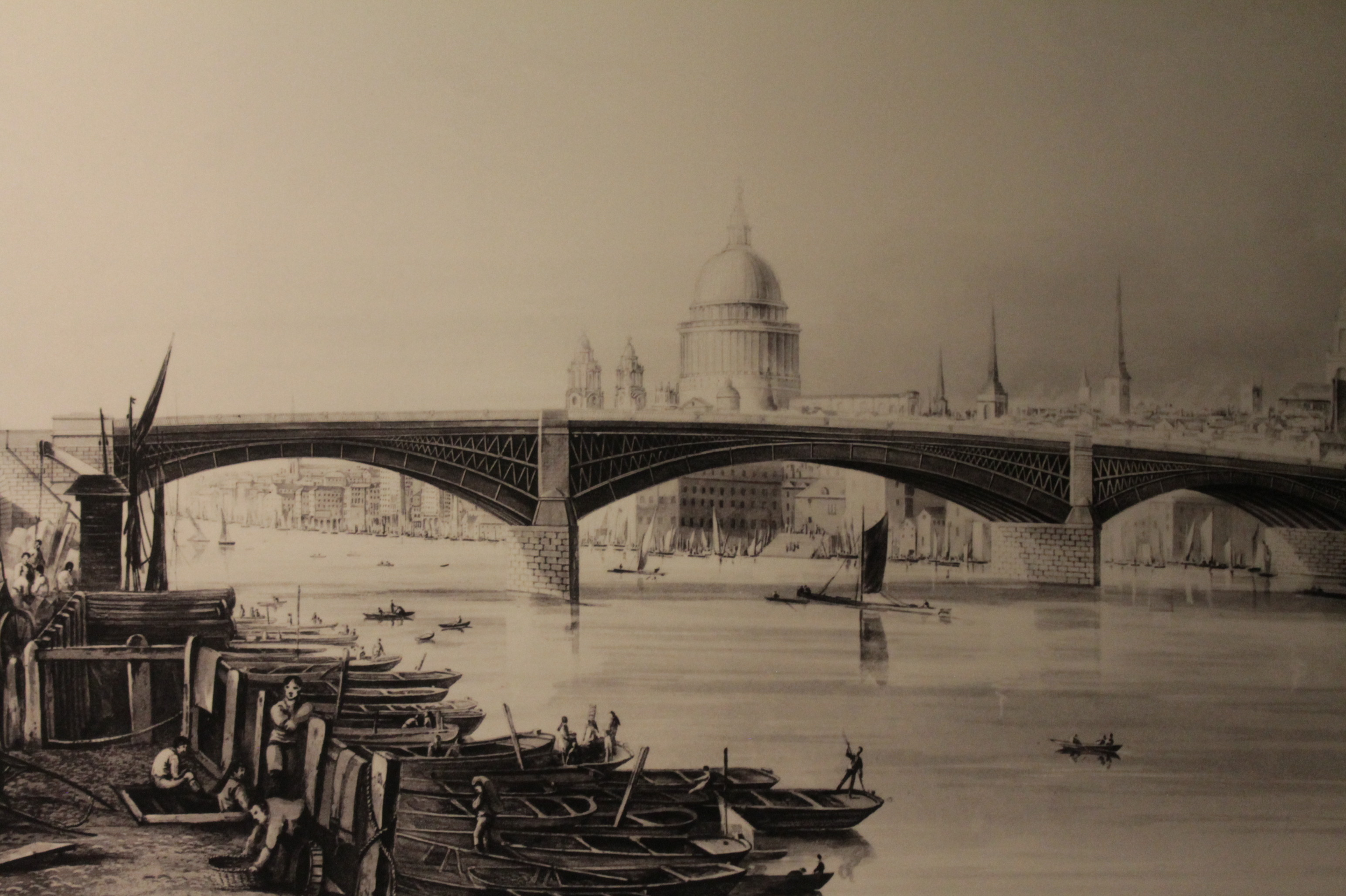
Completion of Southwark Bridge by John Rennie 1819

In 1811 the private Southwark Bridge Company was formed, and authorised by the Southwark Bridge Act 1811 (51 Geo. 3. c. clxvi) to build a bridge across the Thames.

Construction of the first Southwark Bridge, designed by John Rennie the Elder, commenced in 1814, and it opened in 1819, having cost £700,000 to build, equivalent to £50.8 million in 2023. Fifty people lost their lives during the construction.

On the 1818 Cary map of London, it was labelled as Queen Street Bridge. All subsequent maps label it as Southwark Bridge. The bridge consisted of three large cast-iron spans supported by granite piers. The bridge was notable for having the longest cast iron span, 240 feet (73 m), ever made. Unsurprisingly, it became known colloquially as "The Iron Bridge" as mentioned inter alia in Charles Dickens' "Little Dorrit". The iron spans were cast in Masbrough, Rotherham.

Southwark Bridge Transfer Act 1865
- Act of Parliament
- Parliament of the United Kingdom
- Long title: An Act authorizing the Sale or Transfer of Southwark Bridge.
- Citation: 28 & 29 Vict. c. cxcvi

Dates
- Royal assent: 29 June 1865
- Commencement: 29 June 1865

Status: Current legislation

Text of statute as originally enacted

Southwark Bridge Company Act 1872
- Act of Parliament
- Parliament of the United Kingdom
- Long title: An Act for distributing the remaining Assets and finally winding up the affairs of the Southwark Bridge Company, and dissolving the Company; and for other purposes.
- Citation: 35 & 36 Vict. c. cl

Dates
- Royal assent: 25 July 1872

Status: Current legislation

Text of statute as originally enacted

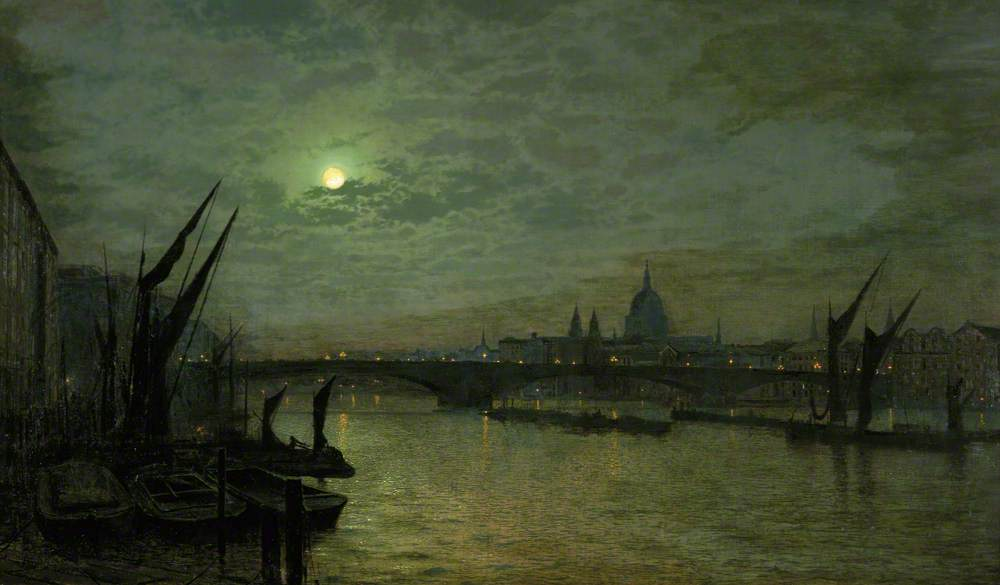
The Thames by Moonlight with Southwark Bridge by John Atkinson Grimshaw, 1884

It was a commercial tolled operation which was trying to compete with the toll free Blackfriars and London bridges nearby, but the company became bankrupt. From 1864 the bridge was rented by the City of London Corporation, and made toll-free. Following the passage of the Southwark Bridge Transfer Act 1865 (28 & 29 Vict. c. cxcvi) it was purchased outright by the corporation in 1868 for £218,868, equivalent to £20.5 million in 2023, about a third of the construction cost. The Southwark Bridge Company was subsequently wound-up by the Southwark Bridge Company Act 1872 (35 & 36 Vict. c. cl).

In 1912 the City of London Corporation decided a wider replacement bridge was required, to accommodate increased traffic. A new bridge on the site was designed by Ernest George and Basil Mott. A contract was awarded to Sir William Arrol & Co. in 1913 to construct the bridge for the Bridge House Estates. War delayed progress, and the bridge was eventually opened for use on 6 June 1921 by King George V.

Halfway along the bridge on the Western side is a plaque which is inscribed:

Re-built by the Bridge House Estates Committee
of the Corporation of London
1913-1921
Opened for traffic by their Majesties
King George V and Queen Mary
6th June 1921
Sir Ernest Lamb CMG, JP Chairman
Basil Mott, CB Engineer
Sir Ernest George RA Architect

The bridge provides access to Upper Thames Street on the north bank and, due to the ring of steel, there is no further road access to the city and the north. The bridge is owned and maintained by Bridge House Estates, a charitable trust overseen by the City of London Corporation. The current bridge was given Grade II listed structure status in 1995.

== Nearby ==
At the north-west side is Vintners' Court, a 1990s office block which has a classical façade of columns and pediment; this was developed on the site owned by the Worshipful Company of Vintners whose hall is behind it on Upper Thames Street.

The south end is near the Tate Modern, the Clink Prison Museum, the Globe Theatre, and the WPP plc and Ofcom office buildings. Below the bridge on the south side are some old steps, which were once used by Thames watermen as a place to moor their boats and wait for customers.

Below the bridge on the south side is a pedestrian tunnel, part of the Queen's Walk Embankment, containing a frieze depicting the Thames frost fairs.

Cycle Superhighway 7 runs along the bridge.

== In popular culture ==
- Southwark Bridge appears in many films, including Harry Potter and the Order of the Phoenix (2007).
- The cream painted houses on the south side of the bridge, Anchor Terrace, just after the FT building, were used for the exterior shots of the shared house in This Life.
- The 1819-1920 "Iron Bridge" is mentioned in the first sentence of "Our Mutual Friend" by Charles Dickens, and several times in his "Little Dorrit", where in Chapter 24 he identifies the toll as being one penny.
- In the 1964 Disney film Mary Poppins, the Banks family mistakenly think that George W. Banks has committed suicide by jumping off the bridge after he is fired from his job at the bank.
- DCI Luther and Alice Morgan meet at Southwark Bridge in the season 3 finale of the BBC crime drama Luther.
- The bridge appears in the final scene of Lock, Stock and Two Smoking Barrels with Tom leaning over the bridge with his cell phone in his mouth set to drop antique guns in the Thames River.
