= Shipping on the Clyde =

Painting by John Atkinson Grimshaw

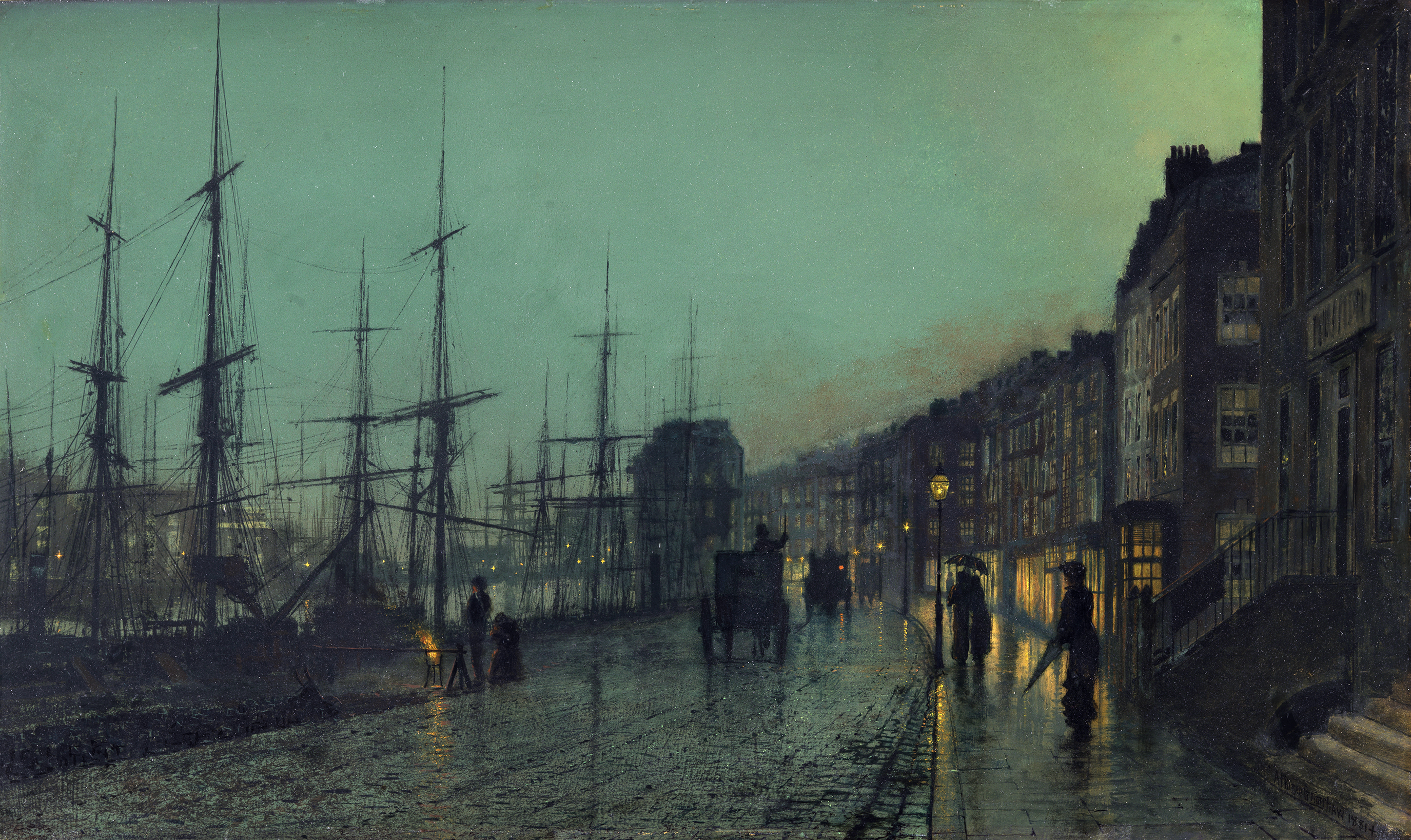
- Artist: John Atkinson Grimshaw
- Year: 1881
- Type: Oil on millboard, cityscape
- Dimensions: 30.5 cm × 51 cm (12.0 in × 20 in)
- Location: Thyssen-Bornemisza Museum, Madrid

Shipping on the Clyde is an oil on millboard cityscape painting by the British artist John Atkinson Grimshaw, from 1881. It is in the Thyssen-Bornemisza Museum, in Madrid.

== History and description ==
The painting features a street scene by the River Clyde in Glasgow illuminated by moonlight. Some lighting comes from the shop windows and a small fire at which two dockworkers are warming themselves. Atkinson Grimshaw was known for nocturnal views of the industrial port cities of the Victorian era and this is a variation on the model.

== Bibliography ==
- Happer, Richard & Stewart, Mark. River Clyde: From Source to Sea. Amberley Publishing, 2014.
- Robertson, Alexander. Atkinson Grimshaw. Phaidon Press, 1996.
- Valance, Hélène. Nocturne: Night in American Art, 1890-1917. Yale University Press, 2018.
