= Knowsthorpe =

Area of Leeds, West Yorkshire, England

Coordinates: 53.784°N 01.522°W

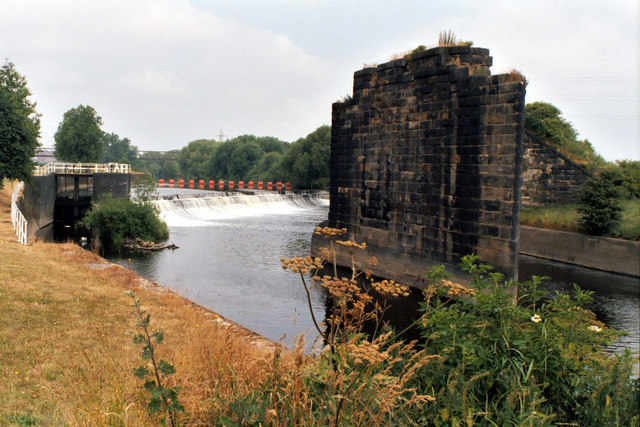
Knostrop weir in 2001

Knowsthorpe, Knostrop or Knostropp is an area of Leeds, West Yorkshire, England, on the River Aire. The spelling "Knostrop" is predominantly used for the large water treatment works in the area. Atkinson Grimshaw painted Knostrop Cut, Leeds, Sunday Night, 1893. The area falls within Temple Newsam ward of Leeds City Council.

== History ==
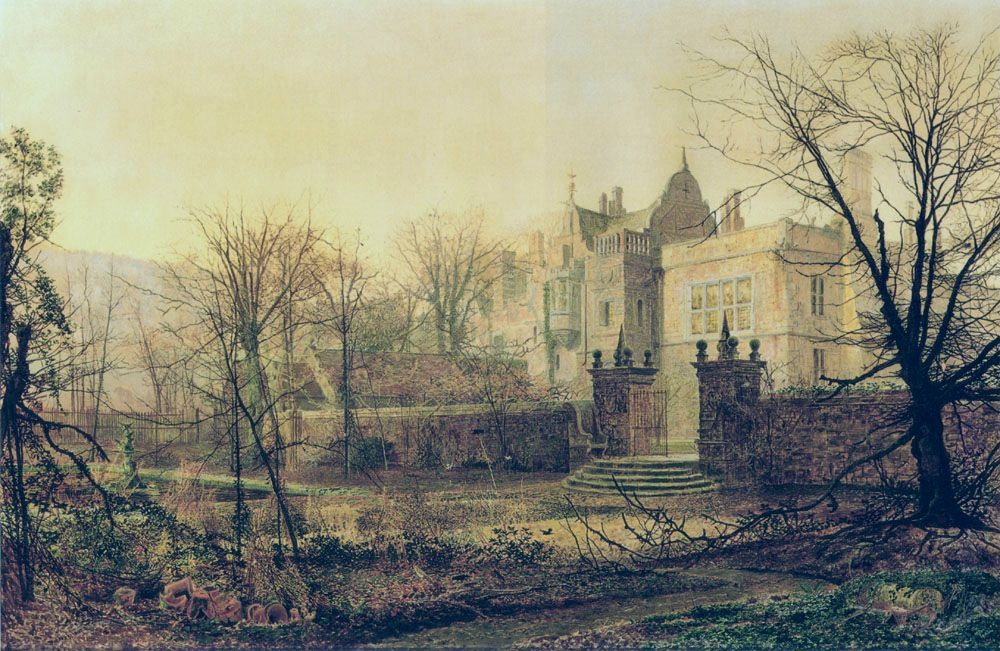
Knostrop Hall by Atkinson Grimshaw

The earliest mention of Knostrop is from the time of the Domesday survey when the hamlet was an area of open fields and the location of the lord of the manor's rabbit warren. In the 13th and 14th centuries the land was cultivated using the three-field system, growing wheat or rye, oats and barley. In 1341, the fields were cultivated by about 30 tenants, some were freeholders but the majority were villeins or bondsmen. One bondsman was Robert Knostrop who paid 4 shillings and 9 pence in annual rent for his 55 acres (22 hectares) of land and along with his fellow bondsmen, was obliged to spend several days ploughing and sowing, make hay and reap the corn for the lord of the manor.

== Knostrop Old Hall ==
Knostrop Hall was built in the 17th century by Adam Baynes, Member of Parliament for Leeds during the Commonwealth, whose family had lived in the district since the mid 16th century. Atkinson Grimshaw lived at the hall in the 1870s, and it was demolished in 1960. The area is now occupied by industrial estates.

== Leeds flood alleviation scheme ==
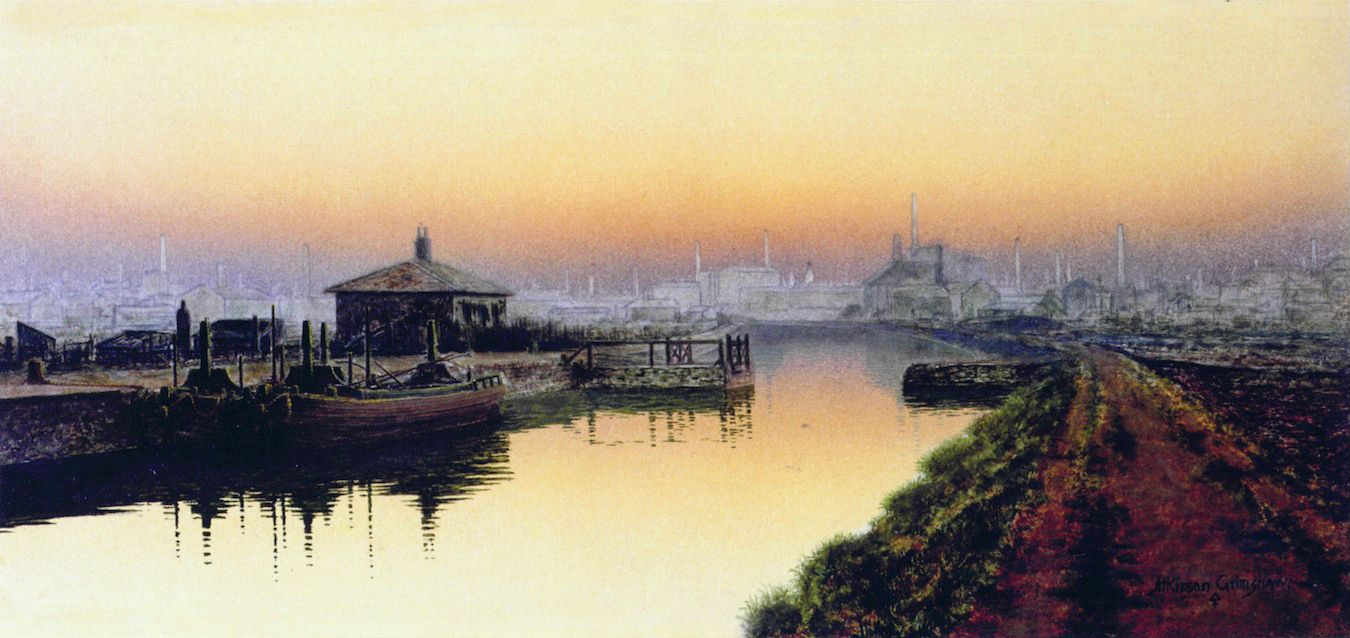
Knostrop Cut by Atkinson Grimshaw (1893)

In October 2017 at Crown Point, Leeds city centre and Knostrop, two movable weirs were installed on the River Aire, the first of their kind in the UK. Reducing the height of the weir, by deflating a 'bladder' has the potential to reduce flood levels by up to 3-foot-3-inch (1 m) upstream of the weir. The Knostrop weir was operated during the 2019 England floods. A 2,000-foot (600 m) stretch of land known as Knostrop Cut Island was removed allowing the river and canal to merge creating additional flood water capacity.
