= Two Crabs =

Painting by Vincent van Gogh

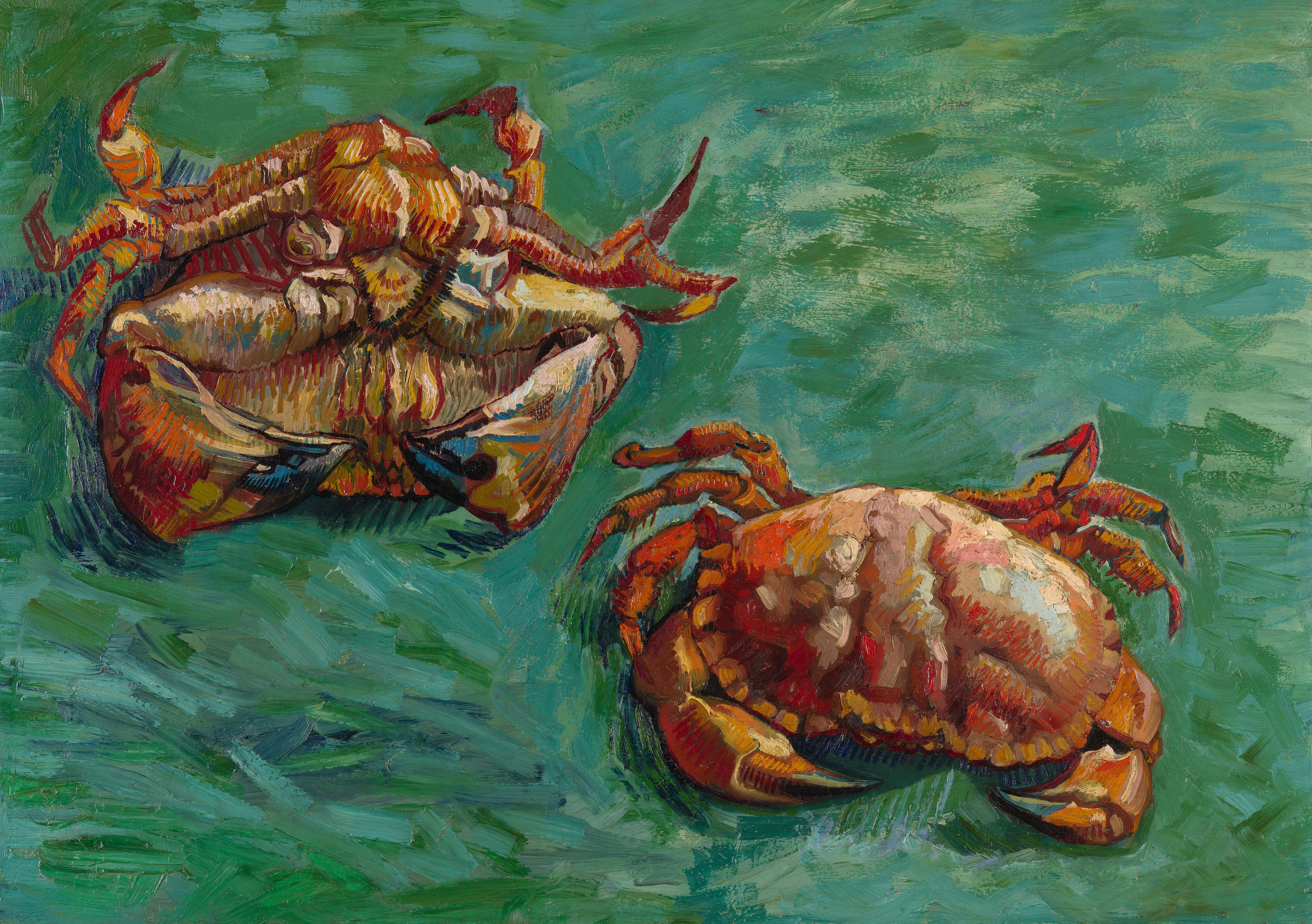
- Artist: Vincent van Gogh
- Year: 1889
- Catalogue: F606; JH1662
- Type: Still life
- Medium: Oil on canvas
- Dimensions: 47 cm × 61 cm (19 in × 24 in)
- Location: National Gallery; London, UK
- Owner: Private collector

Two Crabs is an 1889 oil painting by Vincent van Gogh. It is a still life of two crabs, one on its back and one upright, with a green background. The work is oil on canvas of 47 cm (19 in) high and 61 cm (24 in) wide.

Van Gogh is thought to have painted this work after his hospital release in January 1889. It was possibly inspired by a Japanese print of a crab by Hokusai that he had seen in the magazine Le Japon Artistique, that his brother Theo van Gogh had sent him in September 1888.

The painting is held by the National Gallery in London, on loan from a private collector.

== Related work ==
Crab on its Back, a still life of a single crab lying on its back, is a related painting by Van Gogh. It is in the collection of the Van Gogh Museum in Amsterdam.

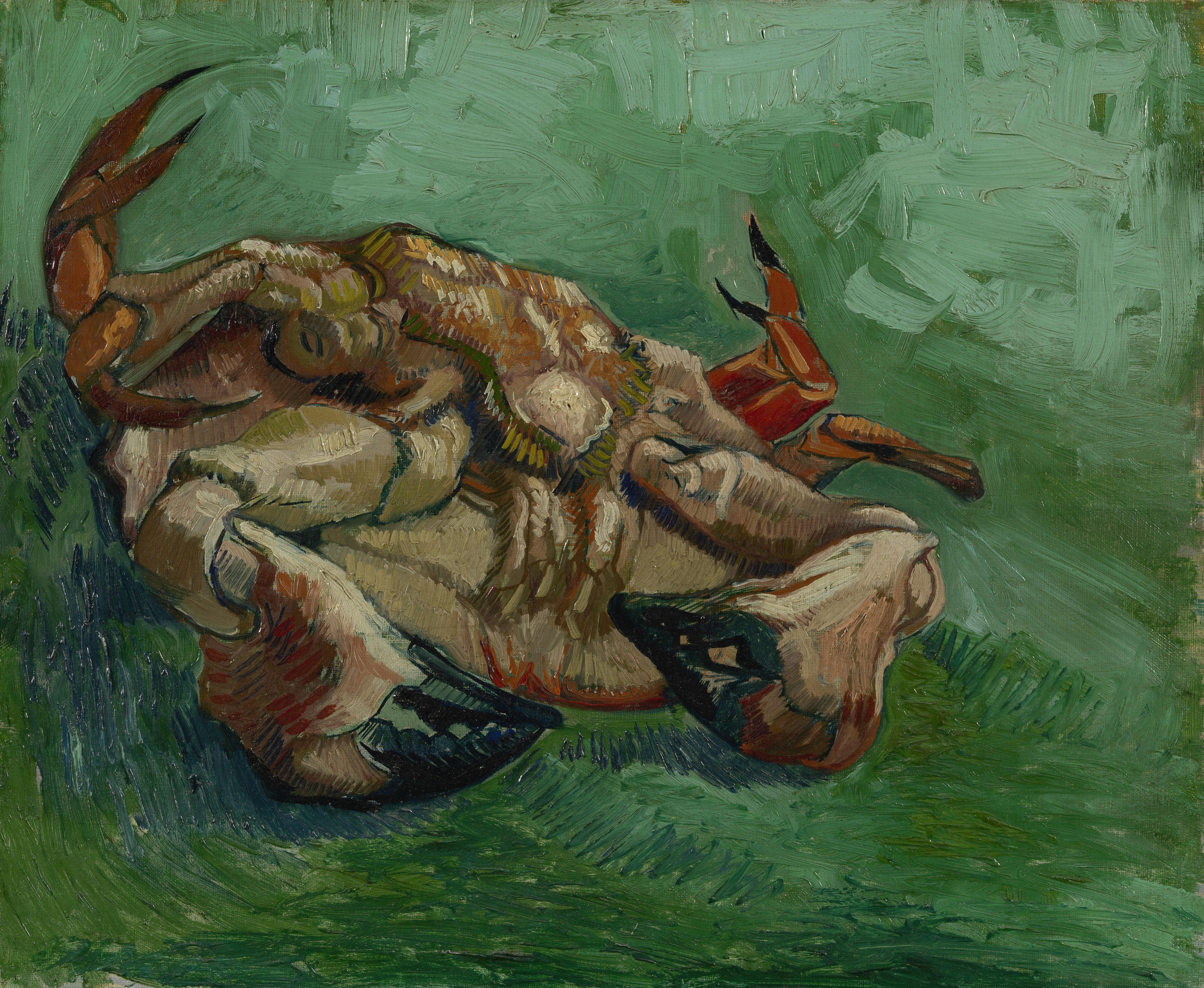
Crab on its Back (1887)

== See also ==
- List of works by Vincent van Gogh
