= Nightfall Down the Thames =

Painting by John Atkinson Grimshaw

- Artist: John Atkinson Grimshaw
- Year: 1880
- Medium: Oil on board
- Dimensions: 38.7 cm × 61.6 cm (15.2 in × 24.3 in)
- Location: Leeds Art Gallery, Leeds

Nightfall Down the Thames is an oil on board painting by English artist John Atkinson Grimshaw, from 1880. It is held at the Leeds Art Gallery.

== History and description ==
The painting depicts a night scene on the River Thames, with St Paul's Cathedral visible in the centre, and several masts of boats in the foreground. A smaller boat, with several crewmen, can be seen at the right. Unlike Grimshaw's Reflections on the Thames, Westminster which depicts the river lit by the light of the moon and electric lamps along the Victoria Embankment, the painting takes a perspective more distanced from the life of the city.

The painting, along with Grimshaw's other night scenes reputedly inspired James McNeill Whistler, who may have known Grimshaw personally, to remark "I thought I had invented the Nocturne, until I saw Grimmy's moonlights".

== See also ==
- Reflections on the Thames, Westminster
