= View of Heath Street by Night =

Painting by John Atkinson Grimshaw

- Artist: John Atkinson Grimshaw
- Year: 1882
- Type: Oil on board, cityscape
- Dimensions: 36.8 cm × 53.7 cm (14.5 in × 21.1 in)
- Location: Tate Britain, London

View of Heath Street by Night is an oil on board cityscape by the British artist John Atkinson Grimshaw, from 1882. It is held at Tate Britain, in London.

== History and description ==
It depicts a night-time portrayal of Heath Street in the London district of Hampstead. Four Hansom cabs are shown in the distance. Two woman are shown walking the streets alone, with their umbrellas, although they are not depicted as prostitutes. Some other people are also shown in the background. Although Grimshaw is best known for producing views of Northern English cities, he also lived and worked in the capital on occasions. The painting was acquired by the Tate Britain in 1963.

== Bibliography ==
- Robertson, Alexander. Atkinson Grimshaw. Phaidon Press, 1996.
- Vila-Cabanes, Isabel. The Flaneur in Nineteenth-Century British Literary Culture. Cambridge Scholars Publishing, 2018.
