= The Thames by Moonlight with Southwark Bridge =

Painting by John Atkinson Grimshaw

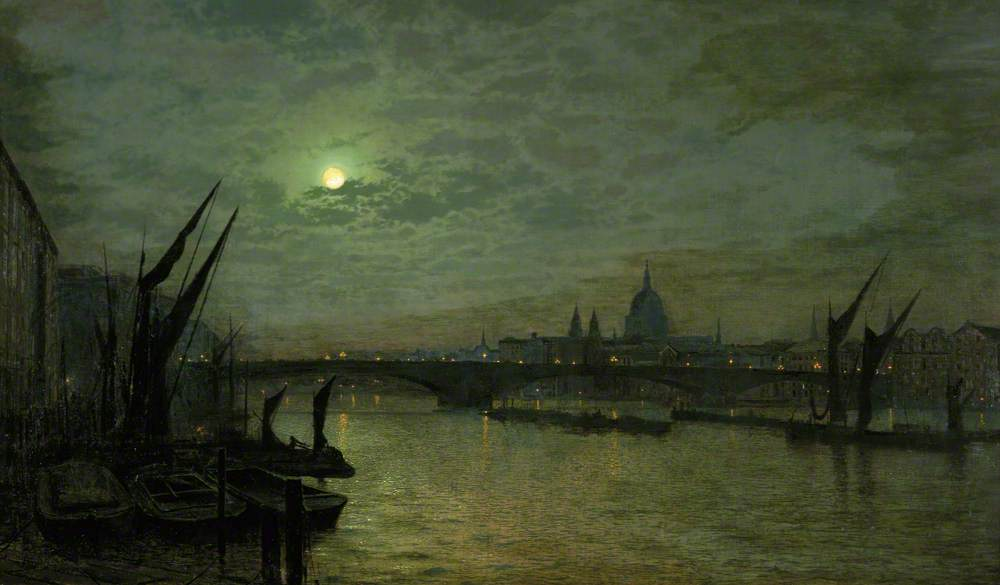
- Artist: John Atkinson Grimshaw
- Year: 1884
- Type: Oil on canvas, landscape painting
- Dimensions: 75 cm × 127 cm (30 in × 50 in)
- Location: Guildhall Art Gallery, London

The Thames by Moonlight with Southwark Bridge is an oil on canvas landscape painting by the British artist John Atkinson Grimshaw, from 1884.

== Description ==
It features a riverscape view of the River Thames by moonlight looking westwards towards Southwark Bridge with St Paul's Cathedral silhouetted on the skyline. While Grimshaw had attracted attention by producing street scenes of the port cities of Northern England, he moved to London to produce a variety of works.

The painting is now in the collection of the Guildhall Art Gallery in the City of London, having been acquired from Sotheby's in 1967.

== Bibliography ==
- Baron, Xavier. London, 1066-1914: Late Victorian and early modern London 1870-1914. Helm Information, 1997.
- Robertson, Alexander. Atkinson Grimshaw. Phaidon Press, 1996.
- Roe, Sonia. Oil Paintings in Public Ownership in the City of London of London. Public Catalogue Foundation, 2009.
