= Reflections on the Thames, Westminster =

Painting by John Atkinson Grimshaw

- Artist: John Atkinson Grimshaw
- Year: 1880
- Medium: Oil on canvas
- Dimensions: 76.2 cm × 127 cm (30.0 in × 50 in)
- Location: Leeds Art Gallery, Leeds

Reflections on the Thames, Westminster is an oil on canvas painting by the English painter John Atkinson Grimshaw, from 1880. It is held at Leeds Art Gallery.

== History and description ==
The painting depicts a view of the River Thames, with the Palace of Westminster and Westminster Bridge as seen from the Victoria Embankment. The river was one of Grimshaw's favoured subjects. The embankment, 2 years earlier, had become the first street in Britain to be permanently lit by electricity.

The painting focuses on the night-time lighting of London, contrasting and combining the artificial electric lightning, a relative novelty, with brilliant moonlight, both reflecting off the waters of the Thames. Other sources of lights include the lamps across Westminster Bridge and the clock face of Big Ben. Some people are seen alking and resting in the night. A woman, with a dog nearby, stares at the river, where four small boats can be seen.

== See also ==
- Nightfall Down the Thames
