= Liverpool Quay by Moonlight =

Painting by John Atkinson Grimshaw

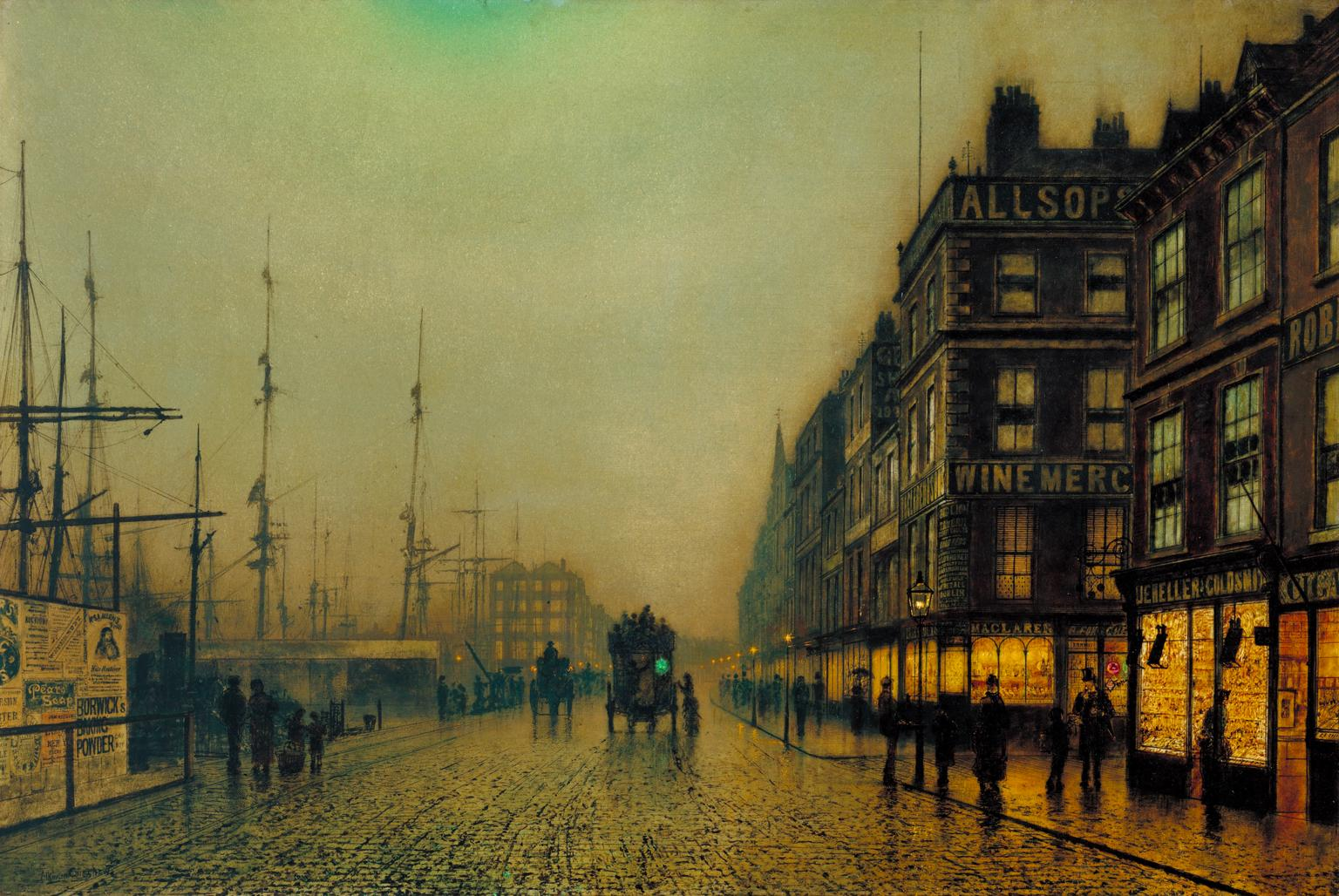
- Artist: John Atkinson Grimshaw
- Year: 1887
- Type: Oil on canvas, landscape painting
- Dimensions: 61 cm × 91.4 cm (24 in × 36.0 in)
- Location: Tate Britain, London

Liverpool Quay by Moonlight is an oil painting on canvas by the British artist John Atkinson Grimshaw, from 1887.

== History and description ==
It is a cityscape that features an evening view of the city waterfront of Liverpool, then in Lancashire. An omnibus with a rear green light has stopped on the damp cobbles to pick up a woman in front of illuminated shop windows. Grimshaw became renowned for his use of light in his depictions of city scenes, inspired initially by the Pre-Raphaelites and later by James McNeill Whistler. Today the painting is in the collection of the Tate Britain in London, having been purchased in 1967.

== Bibliography ==
- Hollander, Anne. Moving Pictures. Alfred A. Knopf, 1989.
- Robertson, Alexander. Atkinson Grimshaw. Phaidon Press, 1996.
