= Crab on its Back =

Painting by Vincent van Gogh

- Een op zijn rug liggende krab (Dutch)
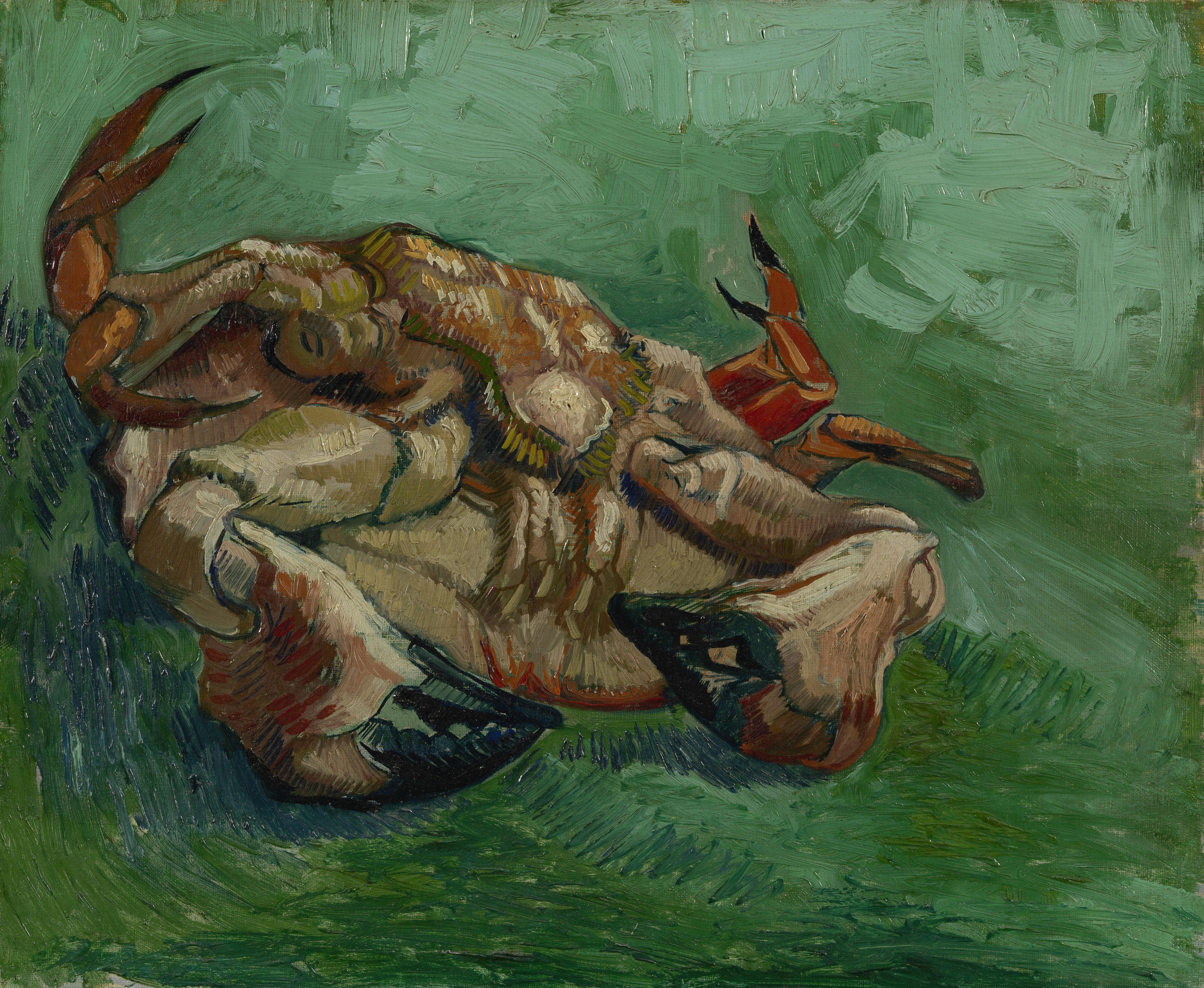
- Artist: Vincent van Gogh
- Year: c. 1887–1889
- Catalogue: F 605
- Type: Still life
- Medium: Oil on canvas
- Dimensions: 38 cm × 46.5 cm (15 in × 18.3 in)
- Location: Van Gogh Museum; Amsterdam, Netherlands

Crab on its Back (Dutch: Een op zijn rug liggende krab) is an oil painting by Vincent van Gogh. It is a still life of a crab lying on its back with a green background. The Van Gogh Museum dates the work to August–September 1887, while other sources date it to early 1889. The painting is in the permanent collection of the Van Gogh Museum in Amsterdam in the Netherlands.

The painting is possibly inspired by a Japanese print of a crab by Hokusai that Van Gogh had seen in the magazine Le Japon Artistique, which his brother Theo van Gogh had sent him in September 1888.

== Related work ==
Van Gogh also painted Two Crabs (1889), a still life with two crabs one of which is lying on its back, on display in the National Gallery in London.

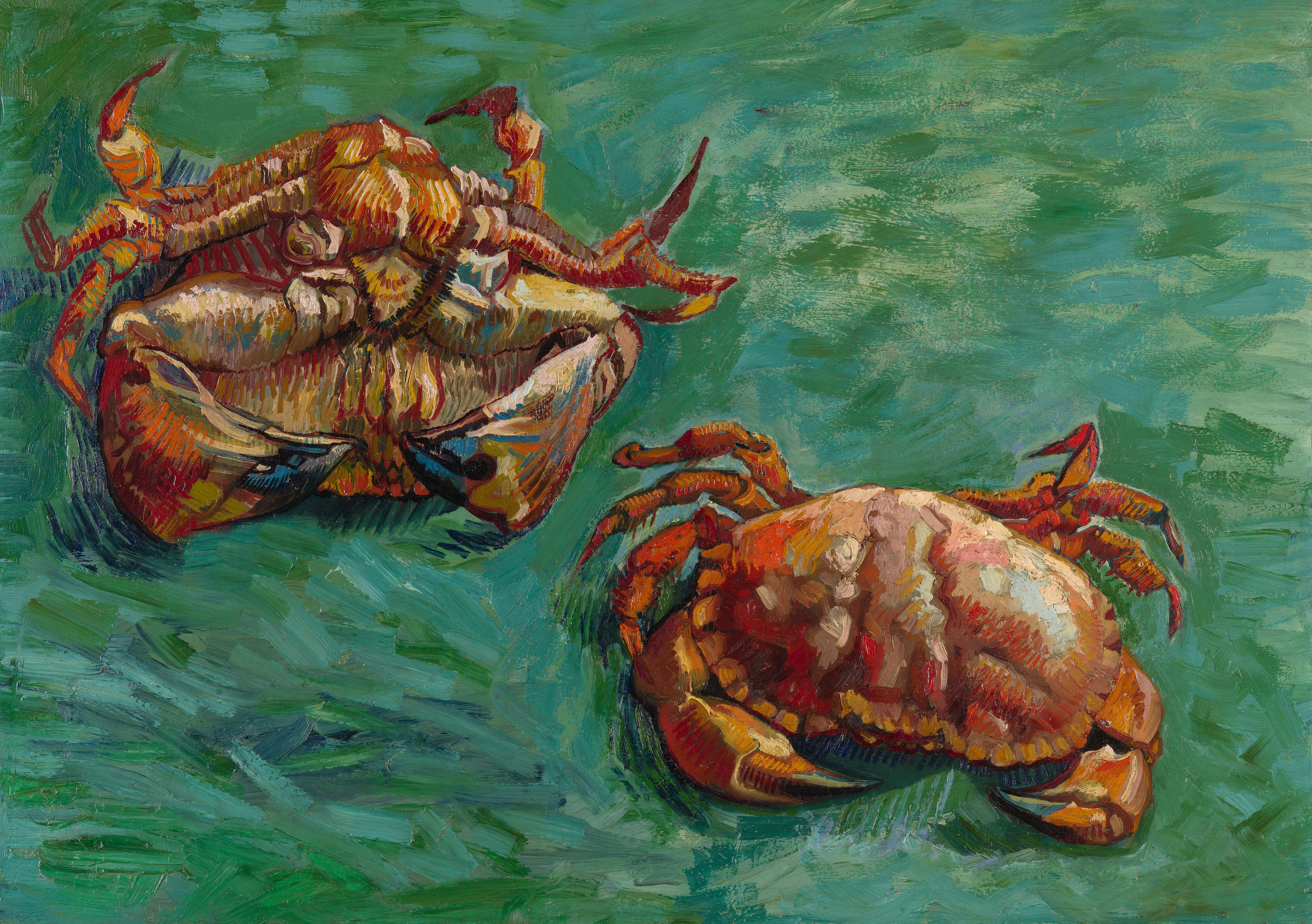
Two Crabs (1889)

== See also ==
- List of works by Vincent van Gogh
