= Paul Maze =

Anglo-French painter

- Born: Paul Lucien Maze; 21 May 1887; Le Havre, France
- Died: 17 September 1979 (aged 92); West Sussex, England
- Known for: Painting, drawing
- Notable work: Whitehall in Winter (1920), Funeral of George VI (1952)
- Movement: impressionism

Paul Lucien Maze (21 May 1887 – 17 September 1979) was an Anglo-French painter. He is often known as “The last of the Post Impressionists" and was one of the great artists of his generation. His mediums included oils, watercolours and pastels and his paintings include French maritime scenes, busy New York City scenes and the English countryside. He is especially noted for his quintessentially English themes: regattas, sporting events and ceremonial celebrations, such as racing at Goodwood, Henley Regatta, Trooping the Colour and yachting at Cowes.

During the First World War, Maze met Winston Churchill in the trenches and their shared love of painting led to a lifelong friendship. Maze became Churchill's artistic mentor, encouraging him to develop his drawing and painting techniques.

== Biography ==
Paul Lucien Maze was born into a French family at Le Havre, Normandy, in 1887. His father was a thriving tea merchant and art collector and his circle of artistic friends included Claude Monet, Raoul Dufy, Camille Pissarro and Pierre-Auguste Renoir. Maze learnt the fundamentals of painting from Pissarro and as a young boy he sketched on the beach with Dufy. At the age of 12, Maze was sent to school in Southampton, England, to perfect his English and whilst there, he fell in love with all things English. He became a naturalised British subject in 1920.

After school, Maze worked for his father's importing firm in Hamburg and Liverpool for ten years before moving to Canada for a year. He then had a brief stint as a sailor, he sailed as Uncertified Third Mate aboard a clipper in the southern ocean where he practiced his photographic skills recording the hardships on deck working the ship in bad weather. At the outbreak of World War I, Maze returned to France and attempted to join the French army but was deemed unfit. Determined to serve, Maze made his way to Le Havre and offered his services to the British and became an interpreter with the British cavalry regiment, the Royal Scots Greys. During the retreat from Mons, Maze became separated from the Royal Scots and narrowly avoided being captured by the Germans but was taken prisoner by a British unit. Maze's position with the Royal Scots Greys was unofficial and his lack of documentation and his odd uniform led the British to think he was a spy. Maze was summarily sentenced to death. On his way to face the firing squad, Maze was recognised by an officer from the Royal Scots Greys who happened to be passing and who quickly secured his release. Maze joined the staff of General Hubert Gough, initially as a liaison officer and interpreter but increasing as a military draughtsman undertaking reconnaissance work. Maze would go to advanced positions, often forward of the British trenches, to produce accurate drawings of enemy positions and other military objectives. The work was very dangerous and Maze was wounded three times in four years. He was awarded the Distinguished Conduct Medal and Military Medal by the British, and the Croix de Guerre and Ordre national de la Légion d'honneur by the French. His book, A Frenchman in Khaki (1934), detailed his experiences of the action that he saw on the Western Front. Churchill wrote the foreword to his book.

After the end of World War I, Maze immersed himself in the Parisian art scene. Some of his friends included André Derain, André Dunoyer de Segonzac, Pierre Bonnard and in particular Édouard Vuillard. Vuillard had the most impact on Maze and encouraged his use of the medium of pastels which he felt best suited the style, personality and freshness in his work. Although Maze still used oils and watercolours, pastels became his preferred choice and it was his talent as a pastellist which brought him global recognition.

In 1921, Maze married Margaret Nelson, a widow of a wartime friend, Captain Thomas Nelson. They moved to London during which time Maze painted many London scenes from pomp and pageantry to the fogs and dismal back streets. He exhibited in many major art galleries in London, America and Paris. In 1939, Maze had his first New York City exhibition and in the foreword to the catalogue, Winston Churchill wrote, "His great knowledge of painting and draughtsmanship have enabled him to perfect his remarkable gift. With the fewest of strokes, he can create an impression at once true and beautiful. Here is no toiling seeker after preconceived effects, but a vivid and powerful interpreter to us of the forces and harmony of Nature".

During World War II, Maze served with the British Home Guard and then as a personal Staff Officer to Sir Arthur Travers Harris. Maze competed in the art competitions at the 1948 Summer Olympics, but did not win a medal. In 1949, Maze and his first wife divorced and in 1950, he married Jessie Lawrie, a Scottish woman who became the subject of many of his paintings. They settled in Treyford, West Sussex, and he depicted their domestic life in many of his works. Maze stated that "Painters are born, not made" and "the greatest teacher is nature" and so it was in rural West Sussex that he concentrated on painting pastoral landscapes and scenes.

In 1952 Maze held his first one-man exhibition at the Wildenstein Gallery in New York and that same year, he went on to record the funeral of HM King George VI. He was selected as the Official Painter of Queen Elizabeth II's Coronation the following year.

Maze died aged 92 with a pastel in his hand, overlooking his beloved South Downs at his home in West Sussex in 1979.

His works are in many major galleries including The Tate, Fitzwilliam Museum, Cambridge, Glasgow Art Gallery and Museum, and in private collections worldwide, including that of Queen Elizabeth the Queen Mother. In a 1989 speech by Churchill's daughter, Lady Soames, said, "The famous French artist Paul Maze was a painting companion. The 'Cher Maître', as we all came to call this charming man, remained a regular visitor to Chartwell for many years".

== Books about Maze ==
- Paul Maze: The Lost Impressionist (1983) Anne Singer, Aurum Press ISBN 978-0906053485
- Paintings by Paul Maze (1964) Acquavella Galleries, University of Virginia
- Paul Maze (1887-1979): an impressionist in England (2010) Marsh Art Gallery, the University of Virginia
- Paul Maze (1977) Wildenstein & Co. (London, England)
- A Tribute to Paul Maze: The Painter and His Time (1967) Marlborough Fine Art
