= John Atkinson Grimshaw =

English painter (1836–1893)

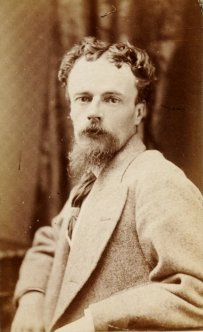
- John Atkinson Grimshaw
- Born: 6 September 1836; Leeds, England
- Died: 13 October 1893 (aged 57); Knostrop, Leeds, England
- Resting place: Woodhouse Cemetery, Woodhouse, Leeds
- Known for: Painting
- Spouse: Frances Theodosia (Fanny) Hubbard (m. 1856)

John Atkinson Grimshaw (6 September 1836 – 13 October 1893) was an English Victorian-era artist best known for his nocturnal scenes of urban landscapes. He was called a "remarkable and imaginative painter" by the critic and historian Christopher Wood in Victorian Painting (1999).

Though entirely self-taught, he is known to have openly used a camera obscura or lenses to project scenes onto canvas, which made up for his shortcomings as a draughtsman and his imperfect knowledge of perspective. This technique, which Caravaggio and Vermeer were suspected to have also used in secret, was condemned by a number of his contemporaries who believed it demonstrated less skill than painting by eye, with some saying his paintings appeared to "show no marks of handling or brushwork", while others "were doubtful whether they could be accepted as paintings at all". However, many recognised his mastery of colour, lighting and shadow, as well as his unique ability to provoke strong emotional responses in the viewer. James McNeill Whistler, whom Grimshaw worked with in his Chelsea studios, stated, "I considered myself the inventor of nocturnes until I saw Grimmy's moonlit pictures."

His early paintings were signed "JAG", "J. A. Grimshaw", or "John Atkinson Grimshaw", though he finally settled on "Atkinson Grimshaw".

== Life ==
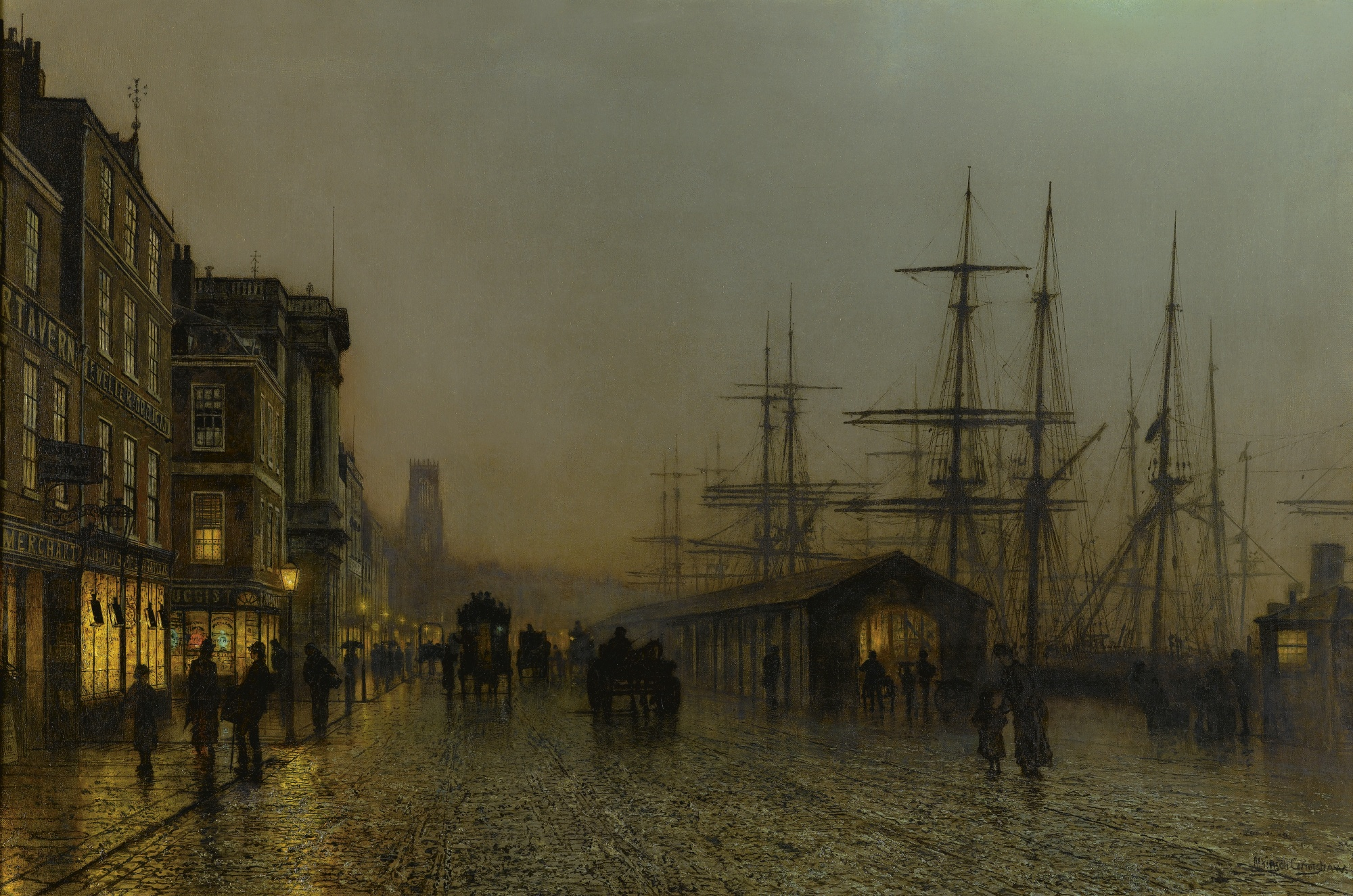
Glasgow, Saturday Night

Grimshaw was born on 6 September 1836 in a back-to-back house in Park Street, Leeds to Mary and David Grimshaw. In 1856 he married his cousin Frances Theodosia (Fanny) Hubbard (1835–1917). In 1861, at the age of 24, to the dismay of his parents, he left his job as a clerk for the Great Northern Railway to become a painter. He first exhibited in 1862, mostly paintings of birds, fruit, and blossom, under the patronage of the Leeds Philosophical and Literary Society. He and his wife moved in 1866 to a semi-detached villa, which is now numbered 56 Cliff Road in Headingley and has a Leeds Civic Trust blue plaque, and in 1870 to Knostrop Old Hall, grid reference SE 32125 32100. He became successful in the 1870s and rented a second home, Castle-by-the-Sea in Scarborough. Scarborough became a favourite subject.

It is not known if Grimshaw used a camera himself; however, he and his son Arthur were elected members of the Leeds Photographic Society at its meeting on 14 December 1890.

Grimshaw died of cancer on 31 October 1893 at Knostrop Old Hall. The contents of his house and studio were sold to raise money for his family. He is buried in Woodhouse Cemetery, now called St George's Field, in Leeds and part of the University of Leeds campus. Cause of death is listed as 'abscess'.

Four of Grimshaw's children, Arthur Edmund Grimshaw (1864–1913), Louis H. Grimshaw (1870–1944), Wilfred Grimshaw (1871–1937), and Elaine Grimshaw (1877–1970) also became painters.

== Work ==
Grimshaw's primary influence was the Pre-Raphaelites. True to the Pre-Raphaelite style, he created landscapes of accurate colour and lighting, vivid detail and realism, often typifying seasons or a type of weather. Moonlit views of city and suburban streets and of the docks in London, Hull, Liverpool, and Glasgow also figured largely in his art. His careful painting and his skill in lighting effects meant that he captured both the appearance and the mood of a scene in minute detail. His "paintings of dampened gas-lit streets and misty waterfronts conveyed an eerie warmth as well as alienation in the urban scene."

Dulce Domum (1885), on whose reverse Grimshaw wrote, "mostly painted under great difficulties", captures the music portrayed in the piano-player, entices the eye to meander through the richly decorated room, and to consider the still and silent young lady who is listening. Grimshaw painted more interior scenes, especially in the 1870s, when he worked under the influence of James Tissot and the aesthetic movement.

On Hampstead Hill is considered one of Grimshaw's finest works, exemplifying his skill with a variety of light sources, in capturing the mood of the passing of twilight into night. In his later career his urban scenes under twilight or yellow streetlighting were popular with his middle-class patrons.

Grimshaw's later work included imagined scenes from the Greek and Roman empires, and he painted literary subjects from Longfellow and Tennyson — pictures including Elaine and The Lady of Shalott. Grimshaw named his children after characters in Tennyson's poems.

In the 1880s, Grimshaw maintained a London studio in Chelsea, not far from the studio of James Abbott McNeill Whistler. After visiting Grimshaw, Whistler remarked that "I considered myself the inventor of Nocturnes until I saw Grimmy's moonlit pictures." Unlike Whistler's Impressionistic night scenes, Grimshaw worked in a realistic vein: "sharply focused, almost photographic", his pictures innovated in applying the tradition of rural moonlight images to the Victorian city, recording "the rain and mist, the puddles and smoky fog of late Victorian industrial England with great poetry."

Grimshaw's paintings depicted the contemporary world but eschewed the dirty and depressing aspects of industrial towns. Shipping on the Clyde, a depiction of Glasgow's Victorian docks, is a lyrically beautiful evocation of the industrial era. Grimshaw transcribed the fog and mist so accurately as to capture the chill in the damp air, and the moisture penetrating the heavy clothes of the few figures awake in the misty early morning.

== Reputation and legacy ==
Grimshaw left behind no letters, journals, or papers. His reputation rested on, and his legacy is based on, his townscapes. There was a revival of interest in Grimshaw's work in the second half of the 20th century, with several important exhibitions devoted to it. A retrospective exhibition "Atkinson Grimshaw – Painter of Moonlight" ran from 16 April – 4 September 2011 at the Mercer Art Gallery in Harrogate and subsequently in the Guildhall Art Gallery, London.

== Gallery ==
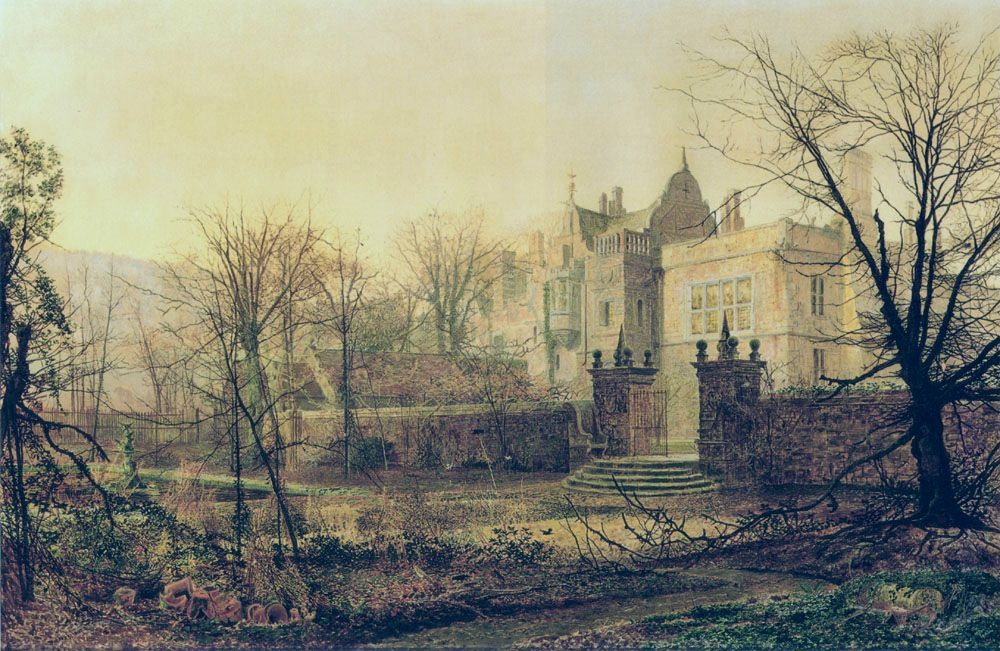
One of his paintings of Knostrop Old Hall

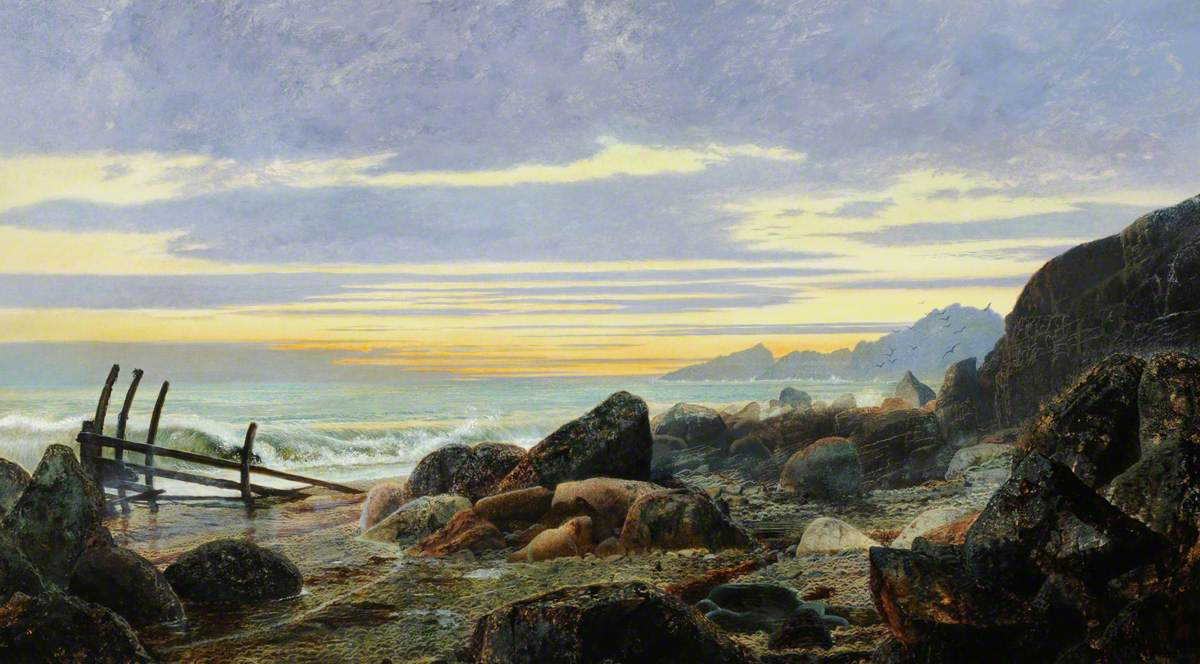
The Ironbound Shore, 1869

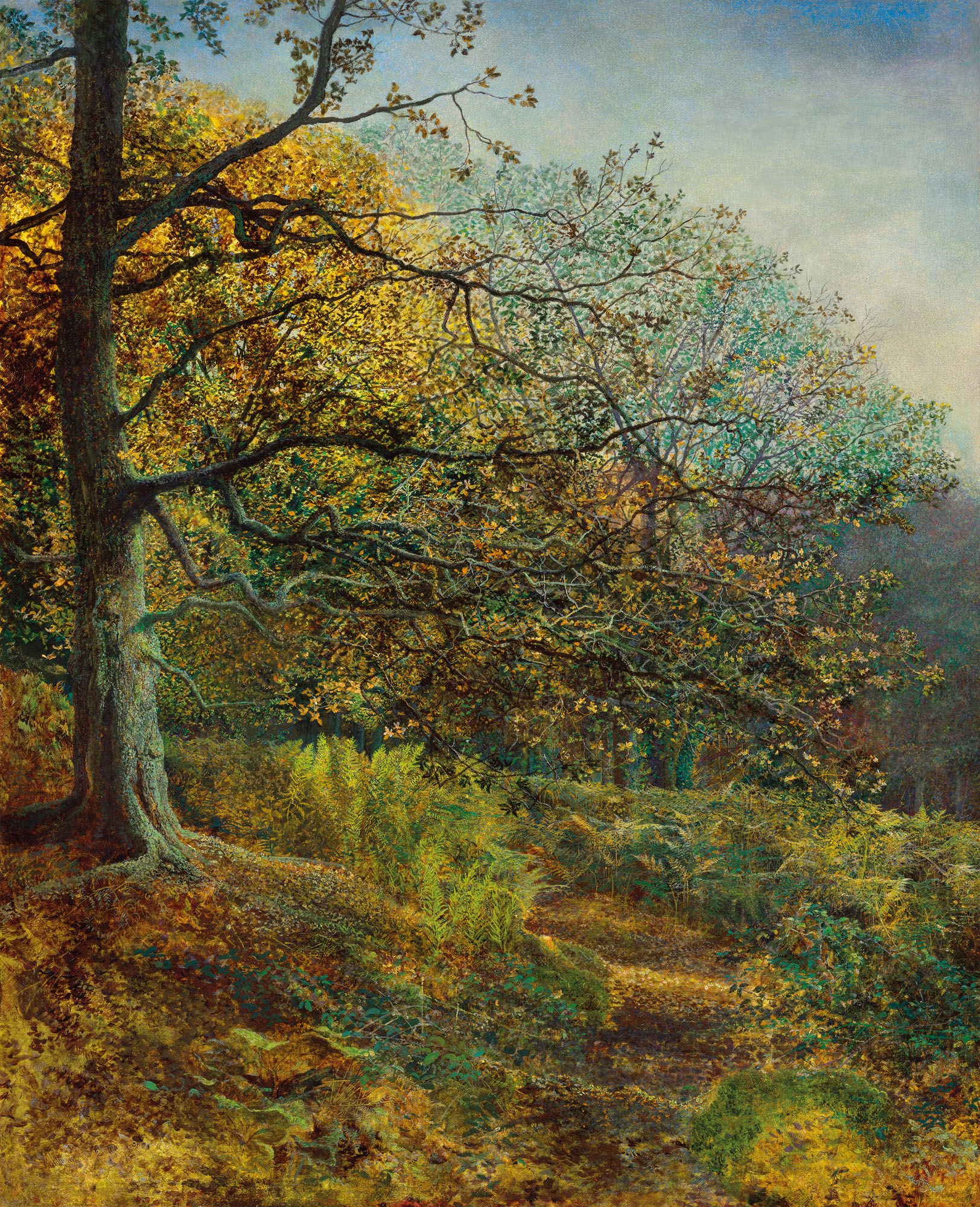
Woodland near Leeds, 1869

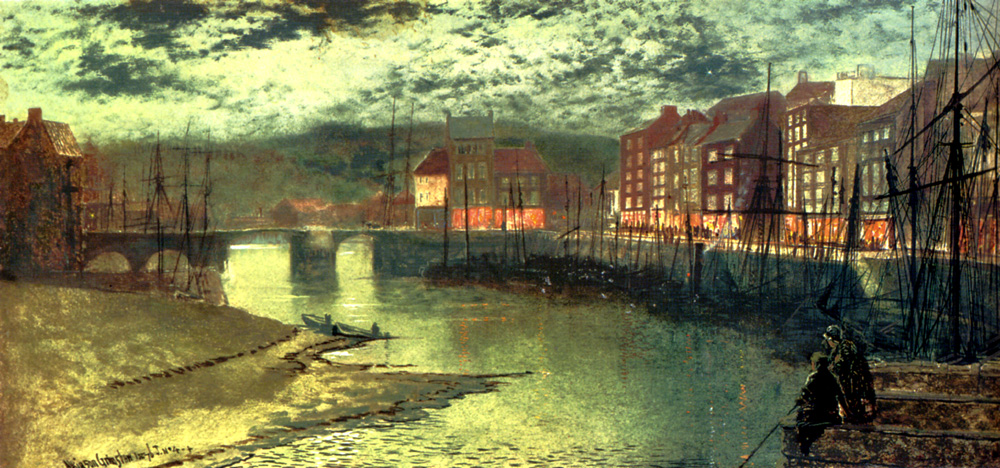
Whitby Docks, 1876

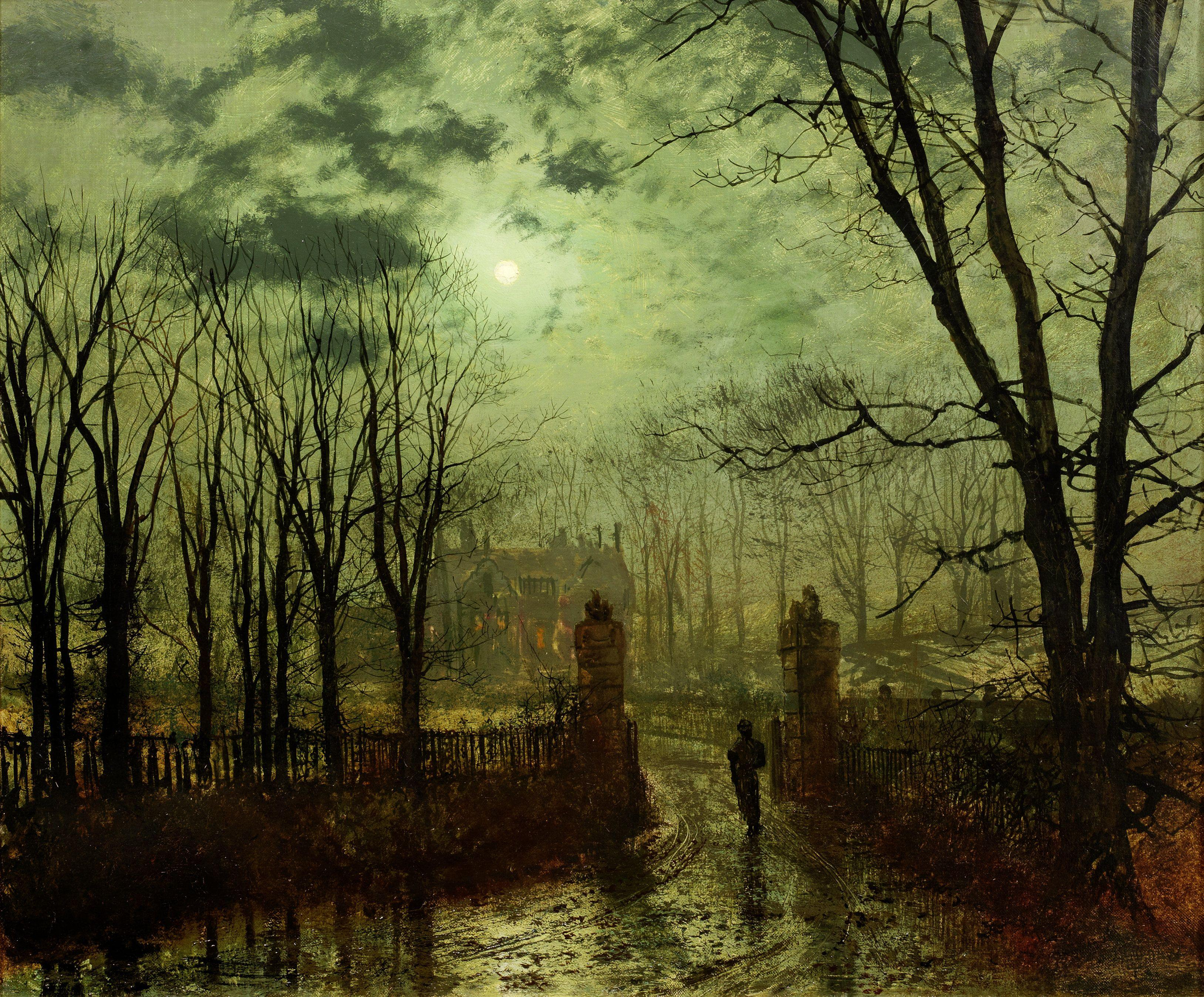
At The Park Gate, 1878

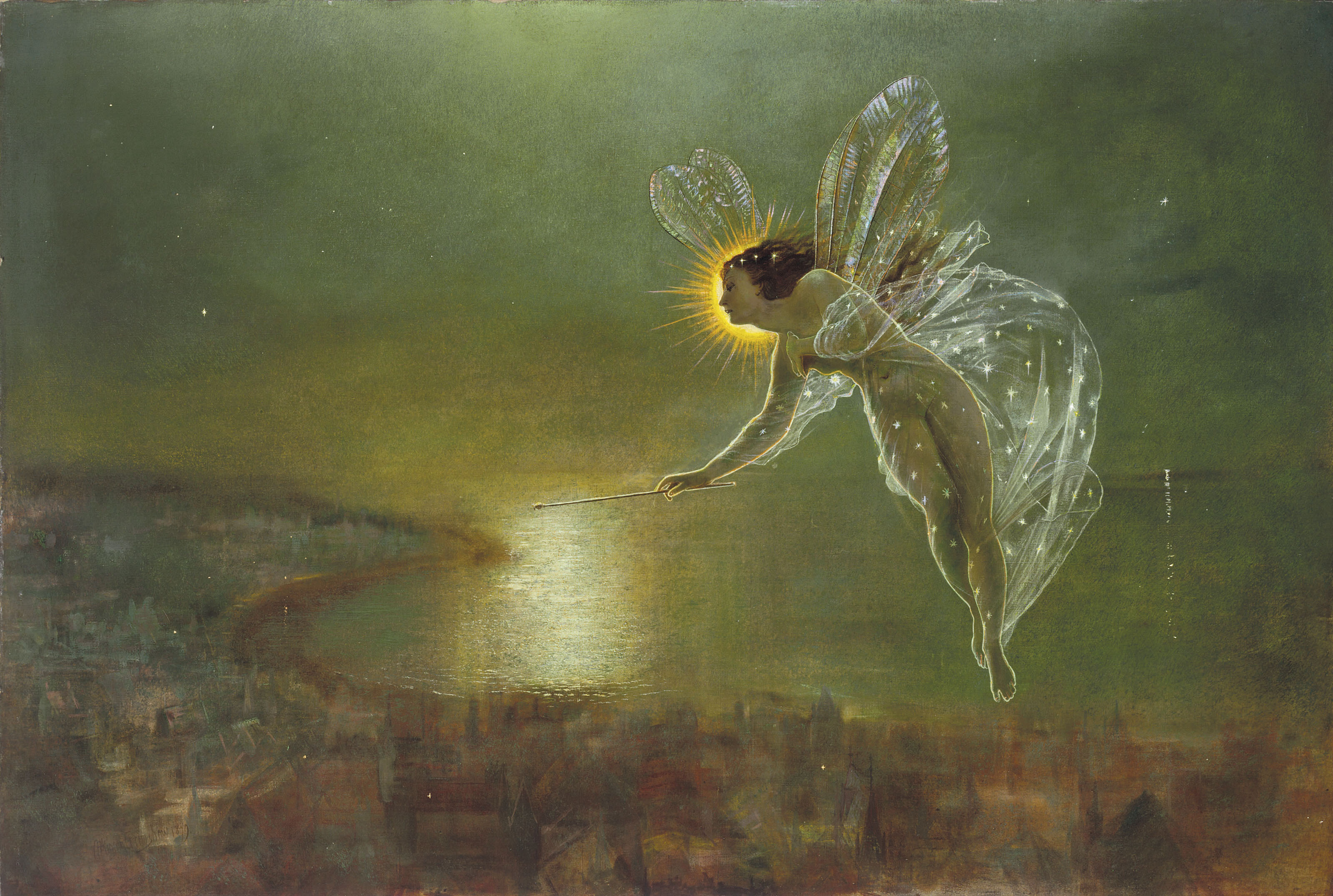
Spirit of the Night, 1879

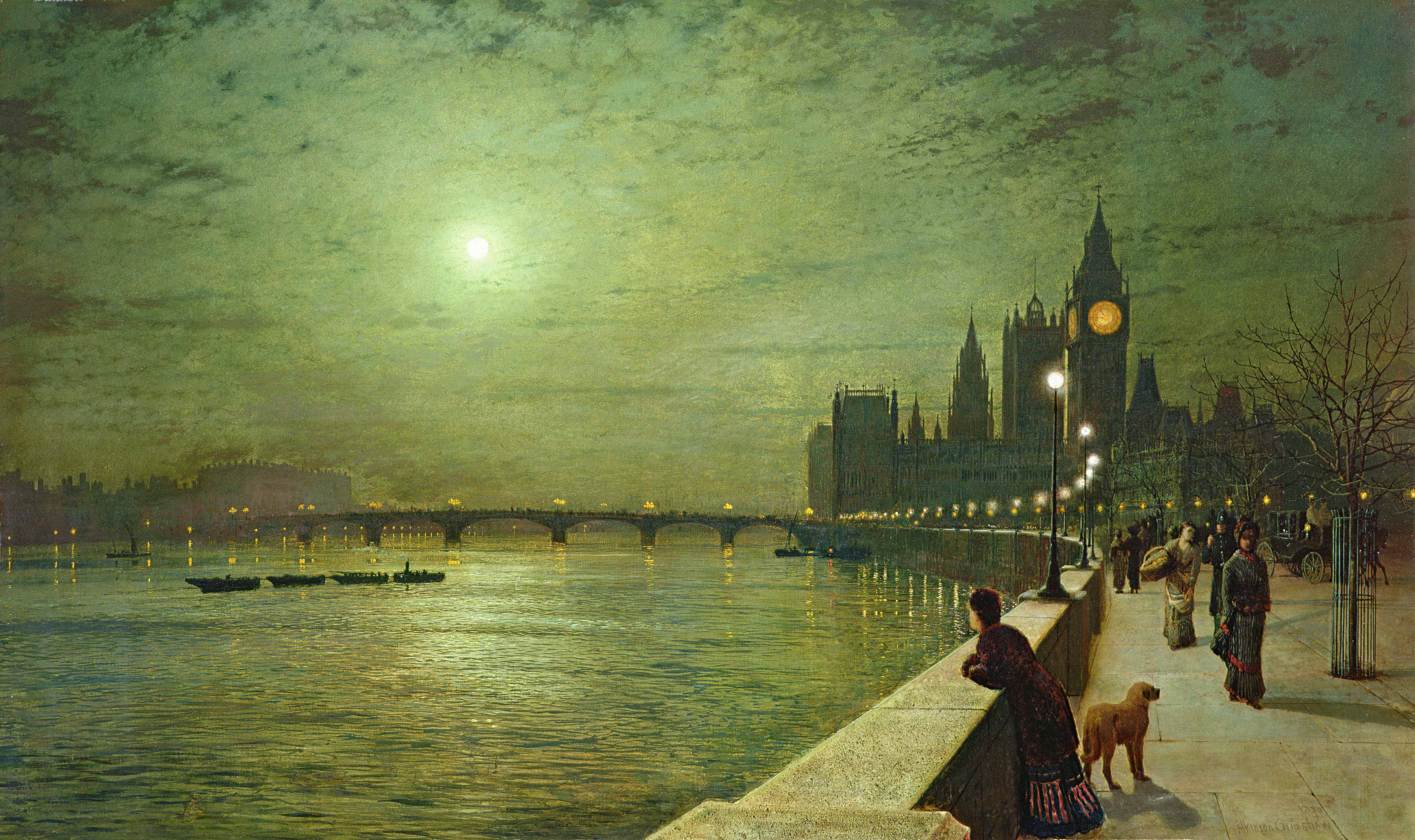
Reflections on the Thames, 1880

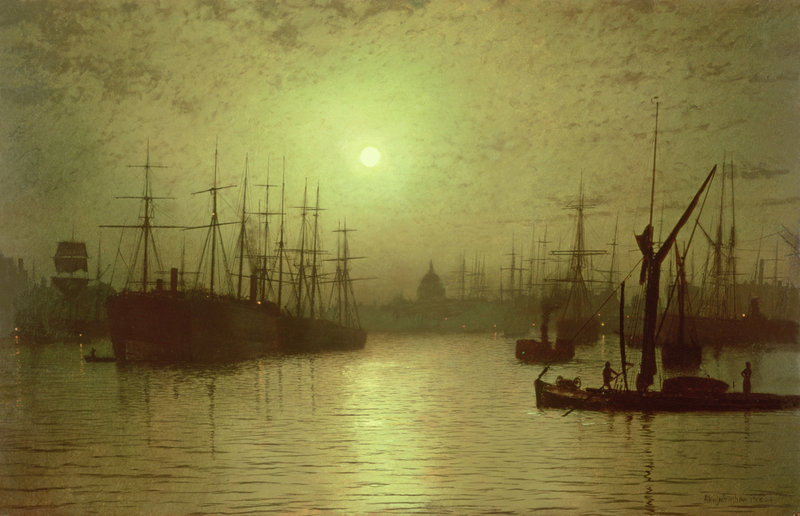
Nightfall Down the Thames, 1880

Leeds Bridge, 1880

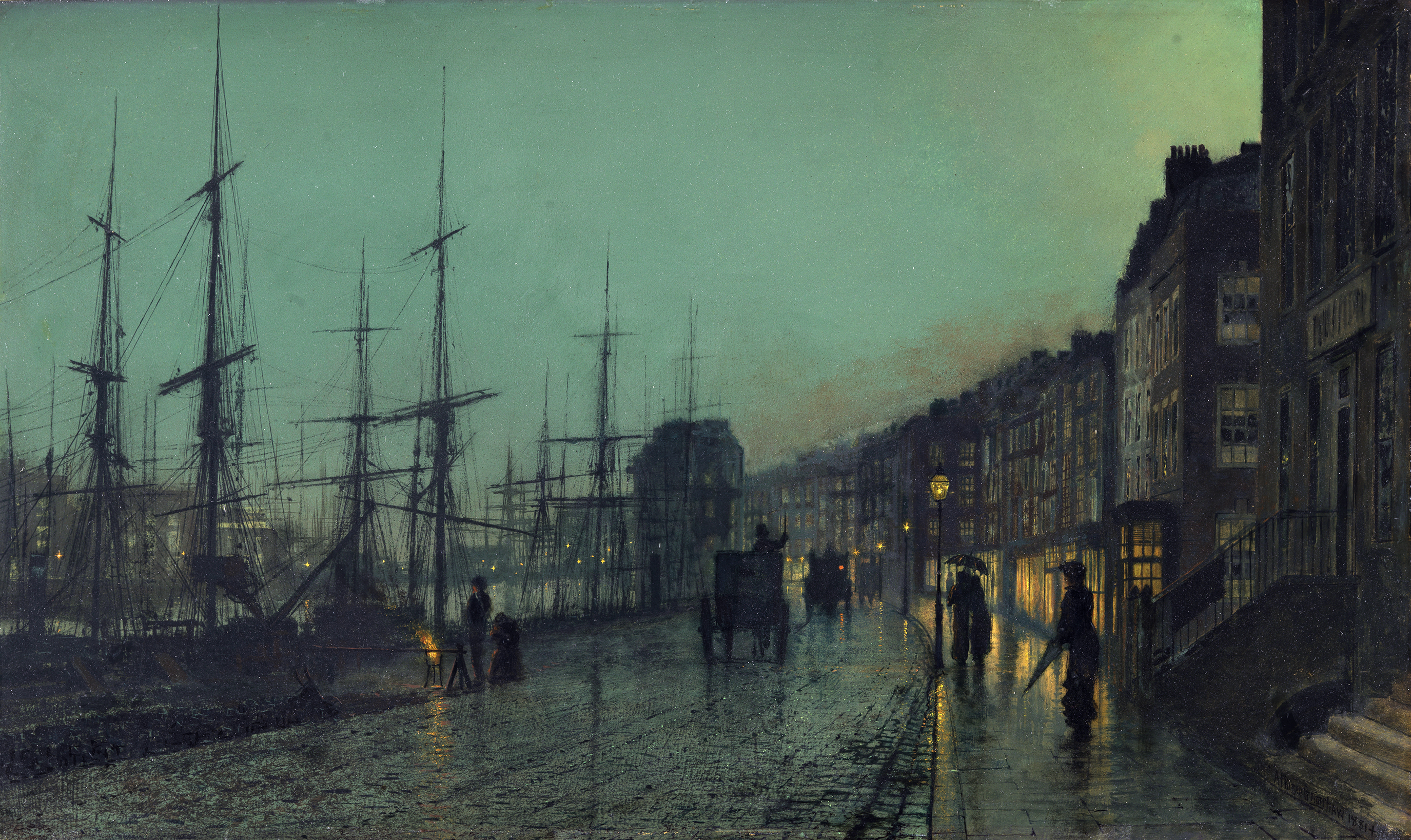
Shipping on the Clyde, 1881

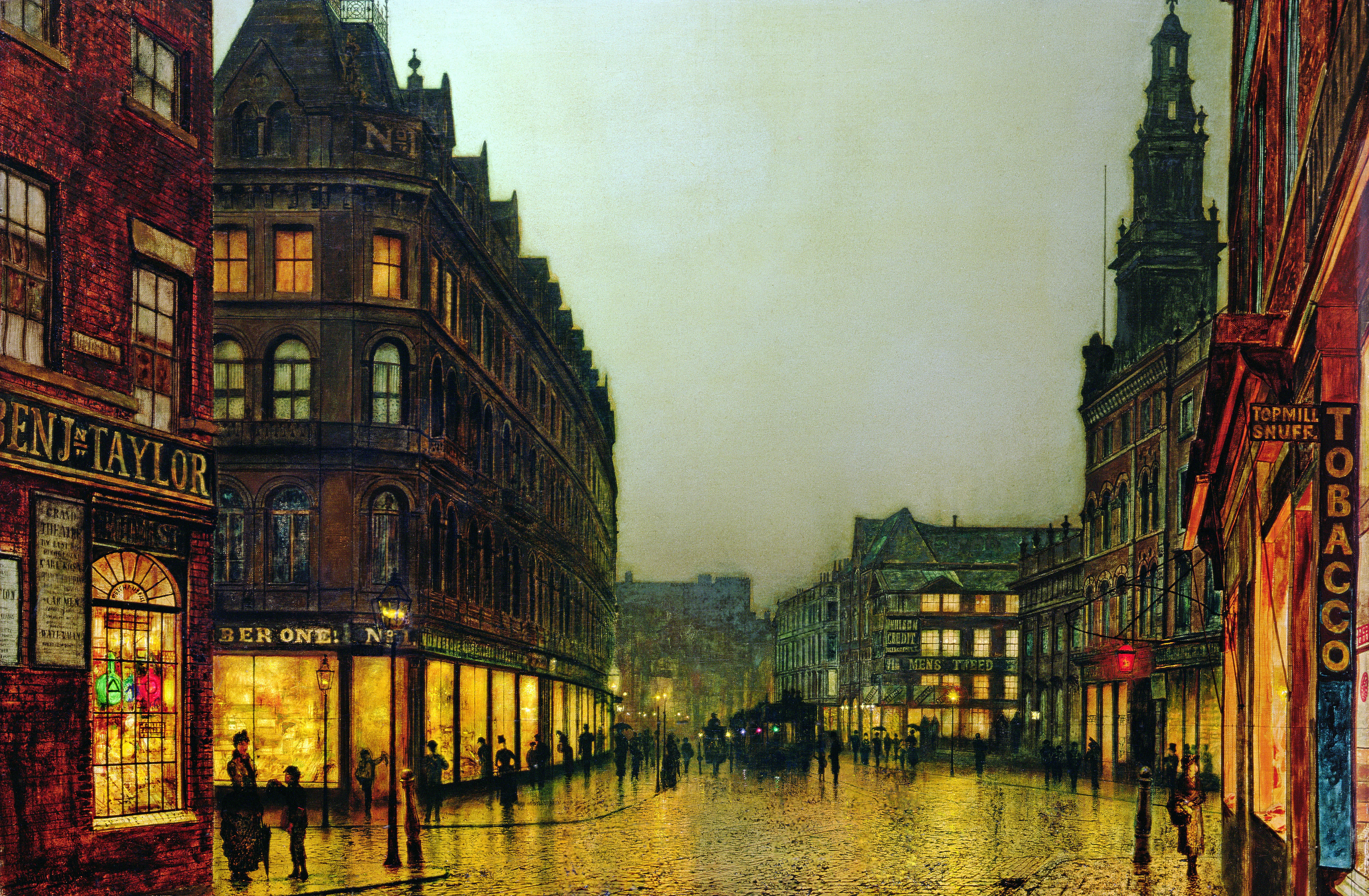
Boar Lane, Leeds, 1881

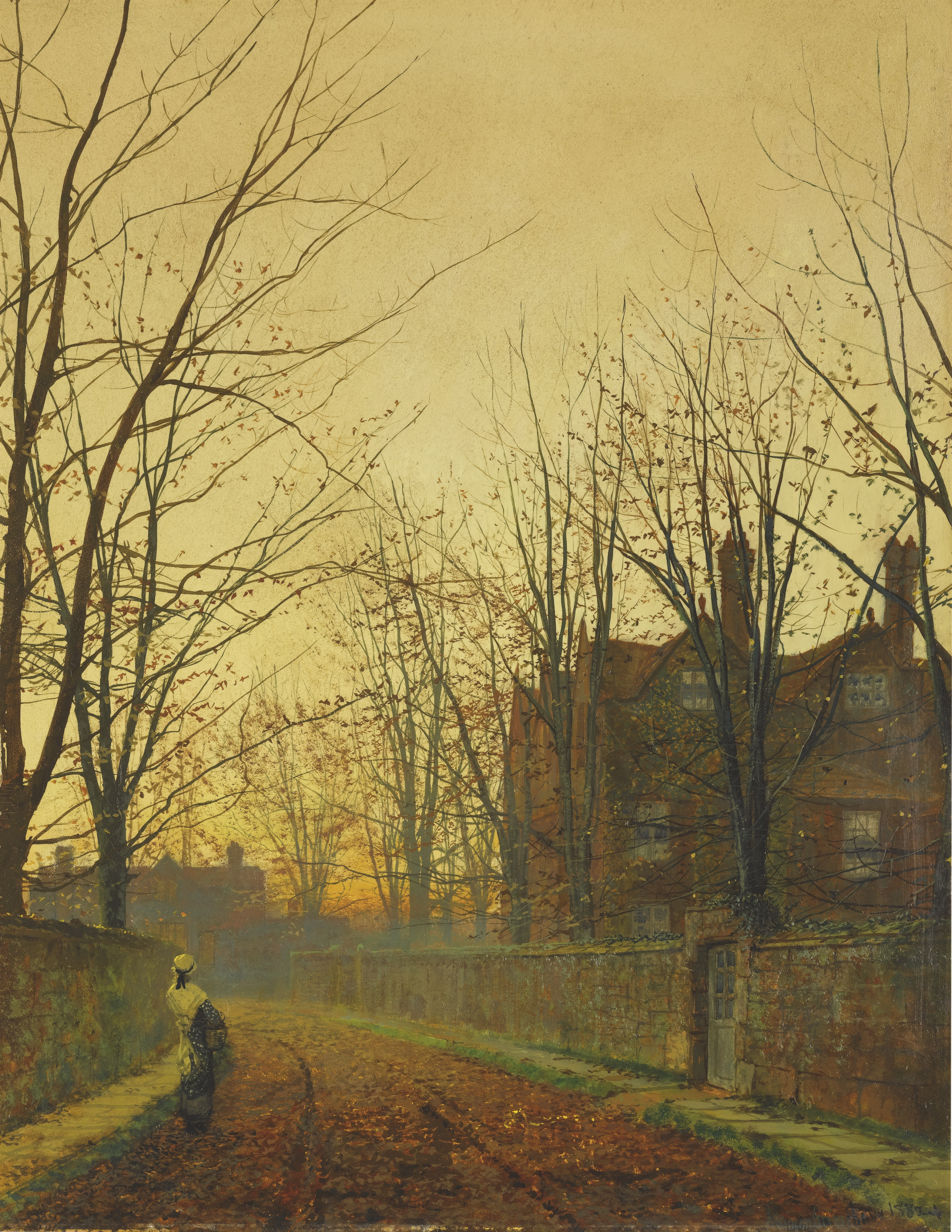
Late October, 1882

View of Heath Street by Night, 1882

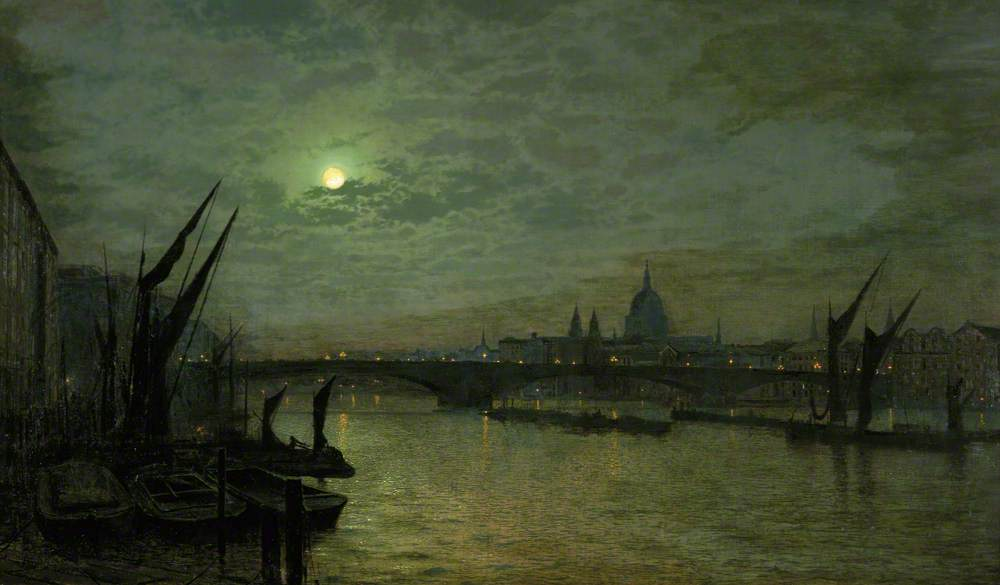
The Thames by Moonlight with Southwark Bridge, 1884

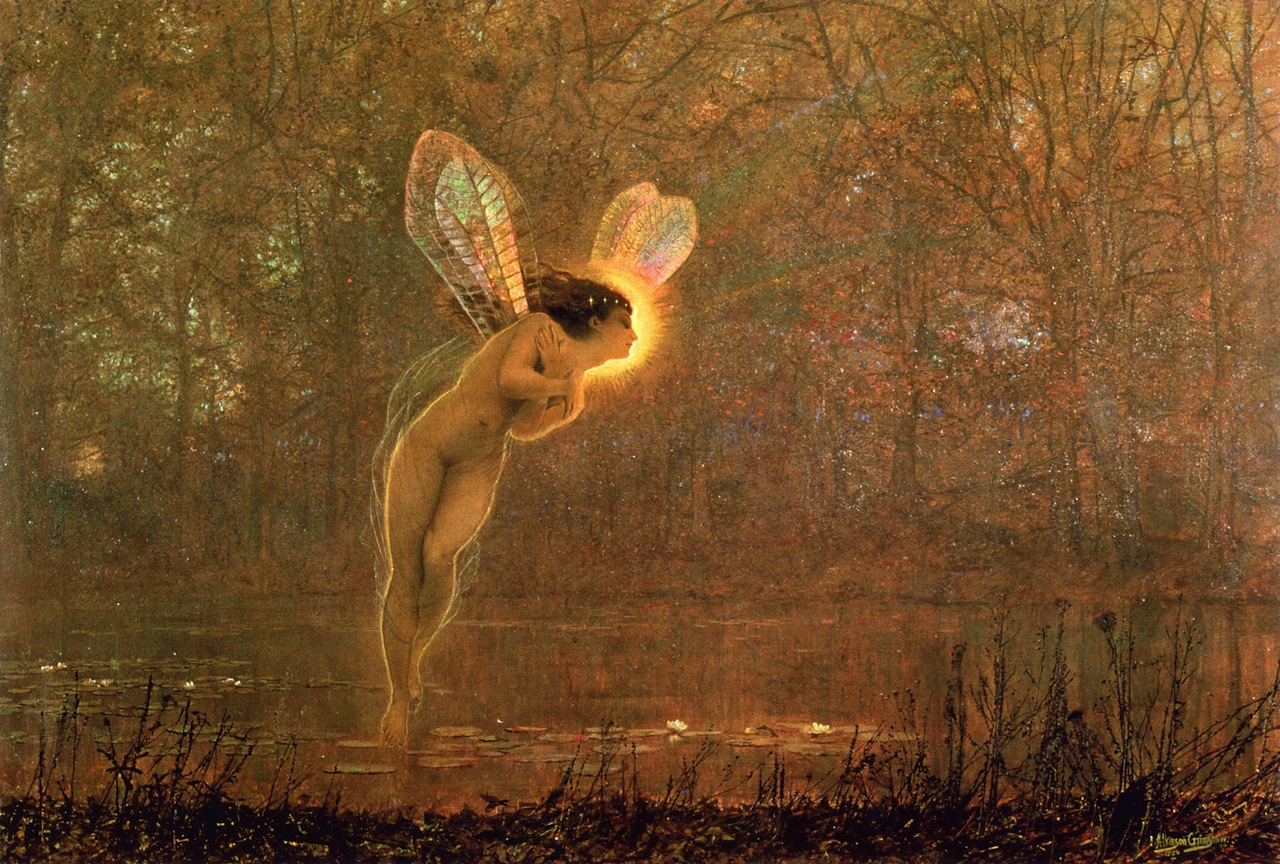
Iris, 1886

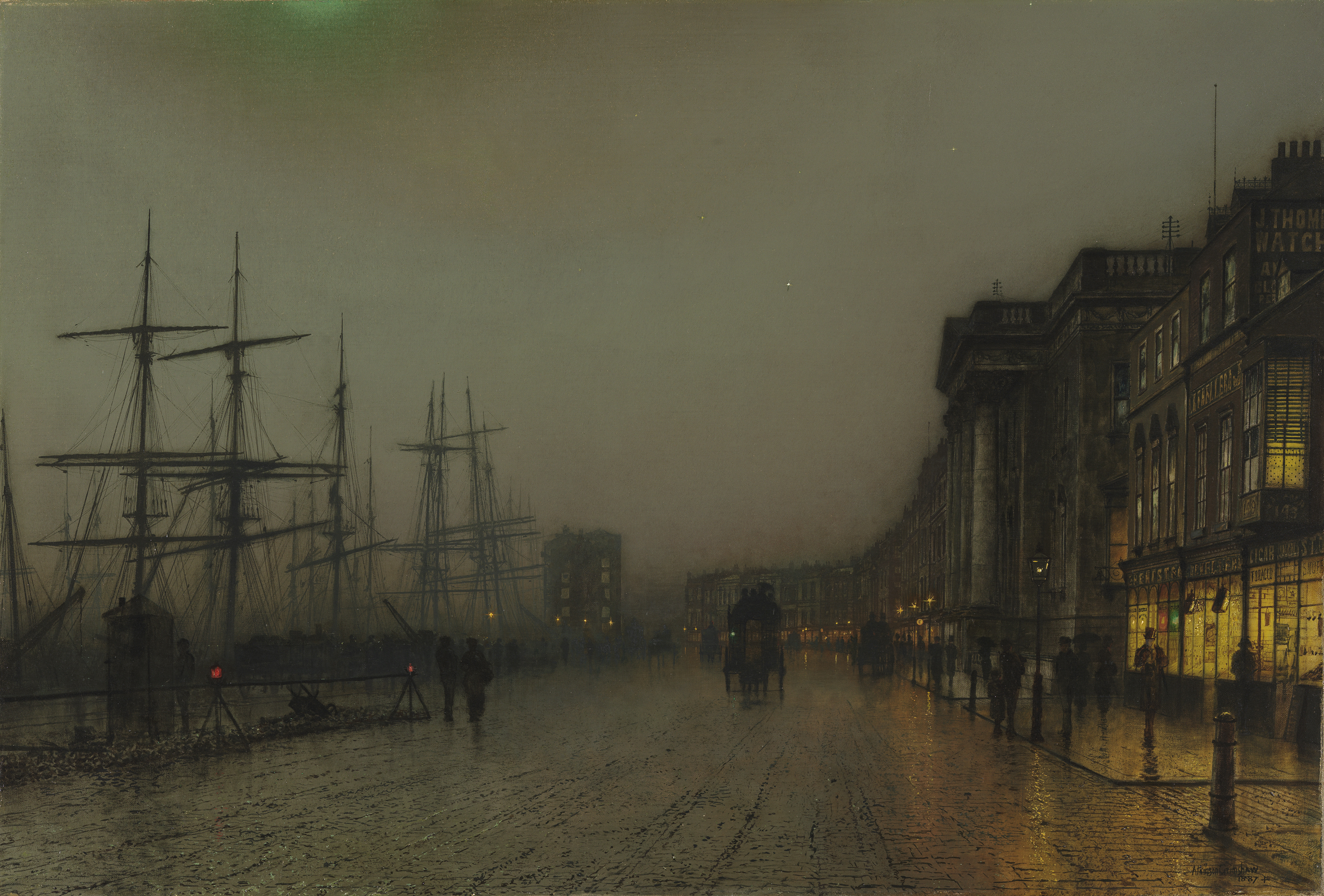
Canny Glasgow, 1887

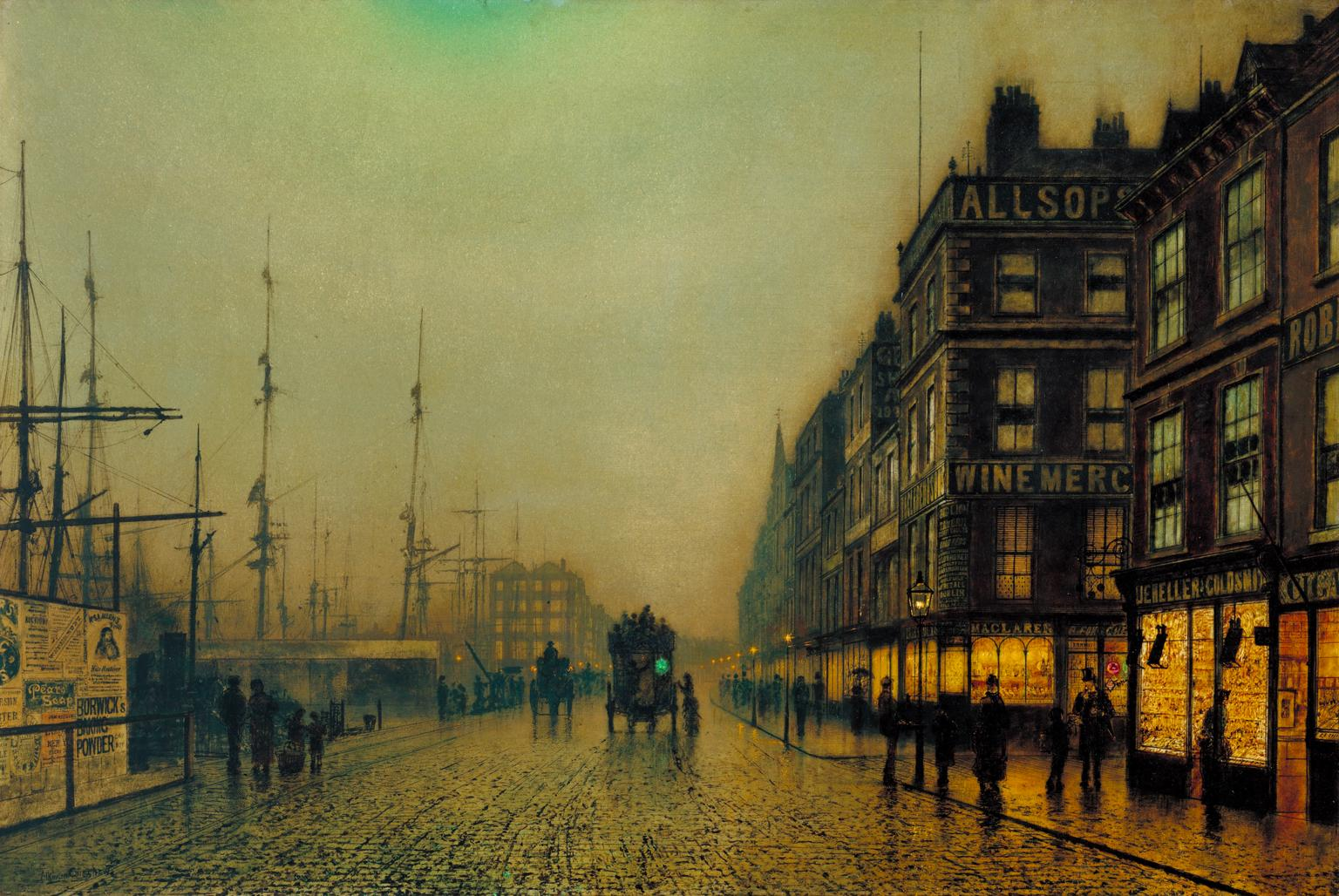
Liverpool Quay by Moonlight, 1887

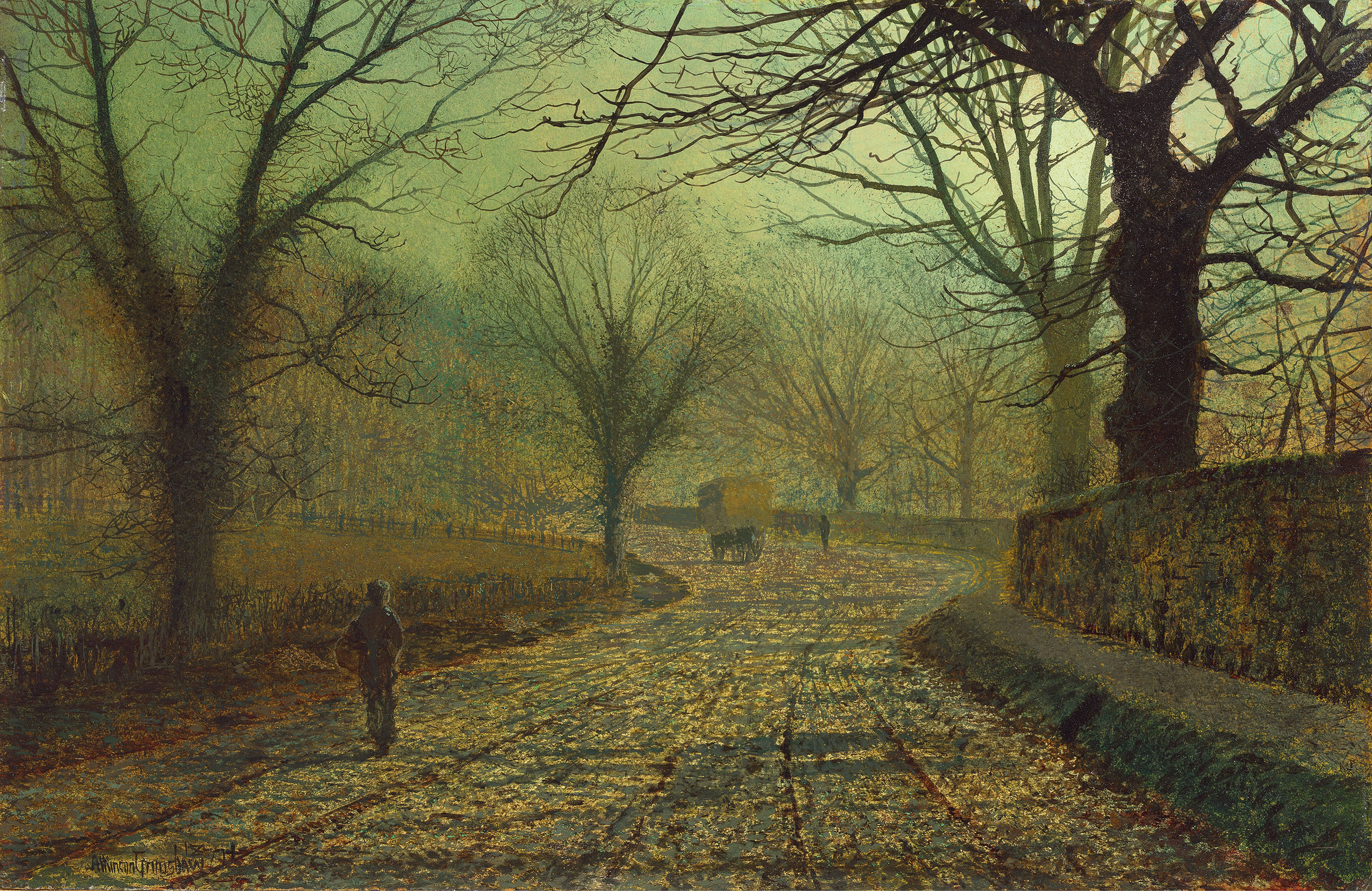
Stapleton Park Stapleton Yorkshire, 1877

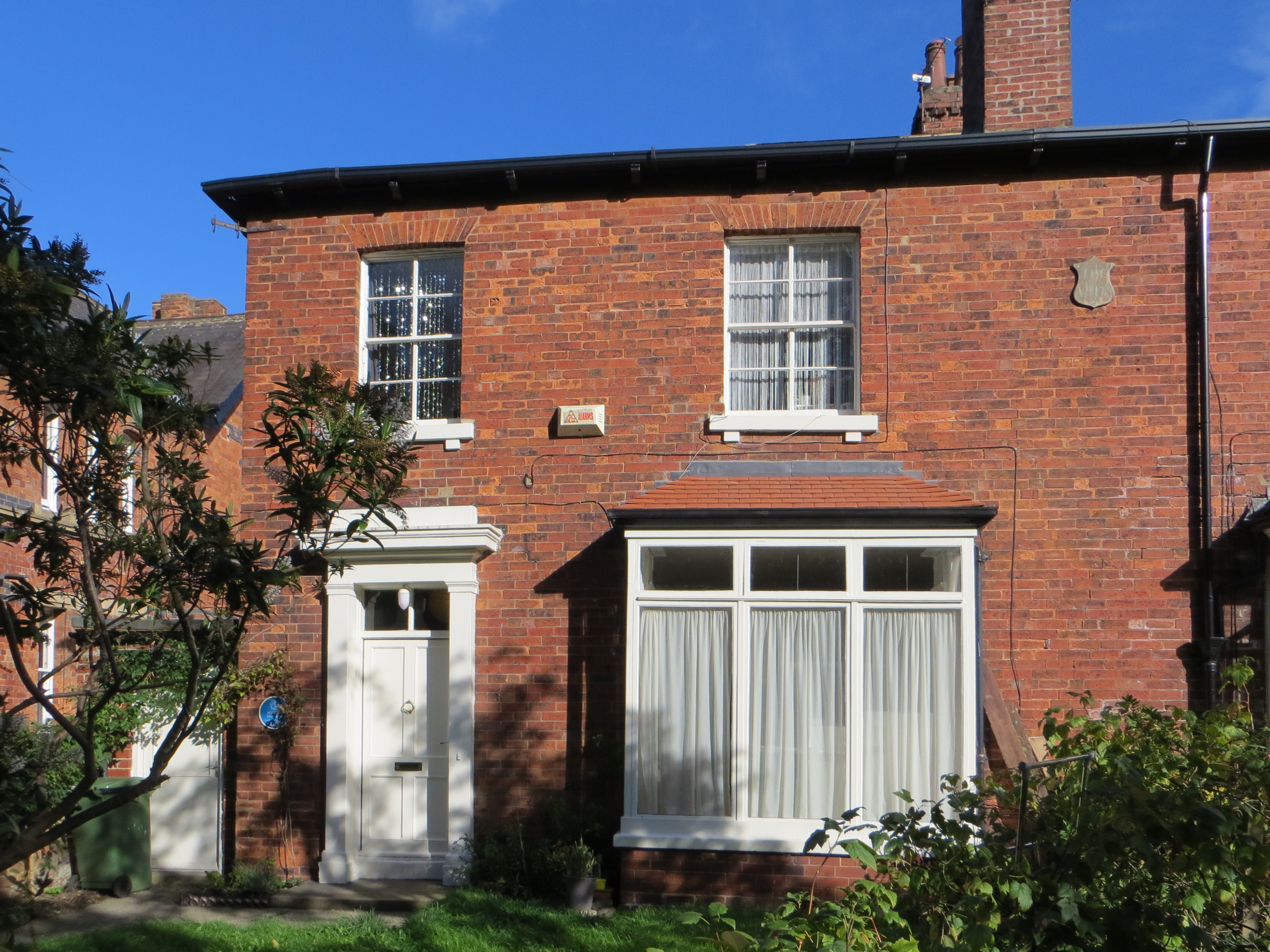
Atkinson Grimshaw's home 1866–70

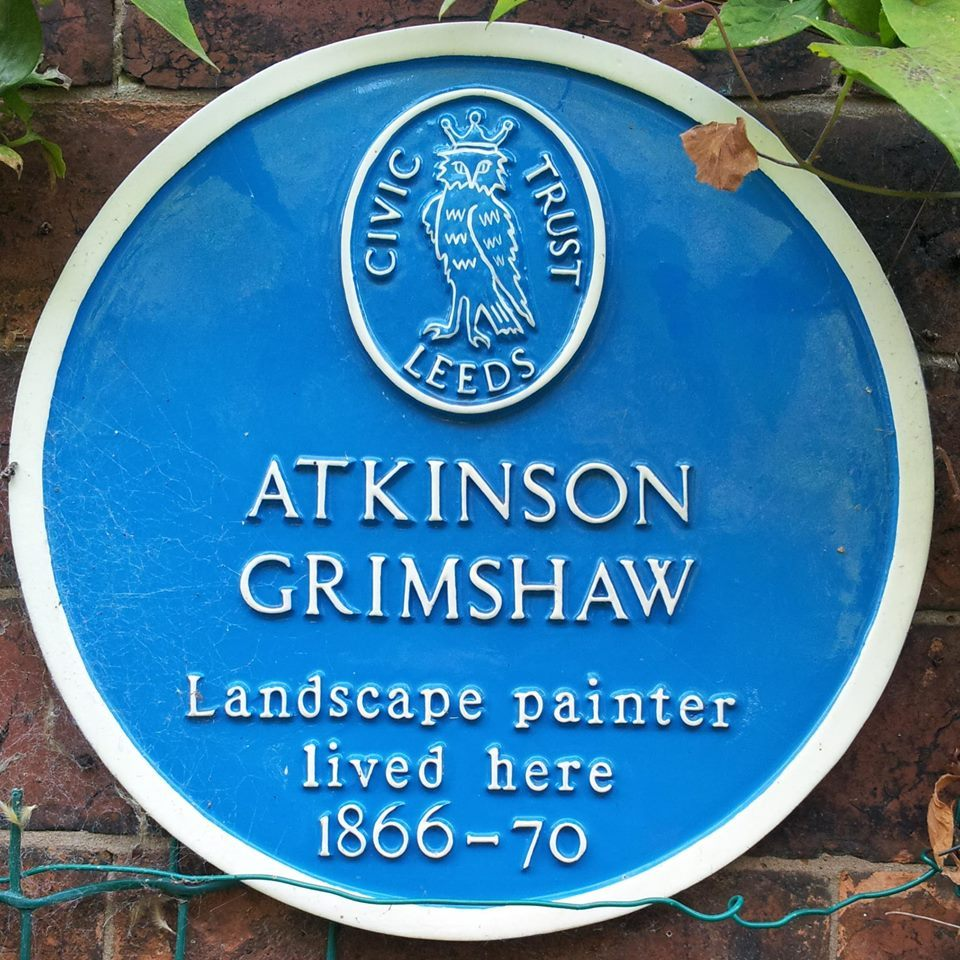
Leeds Civic Trust, blue plaque

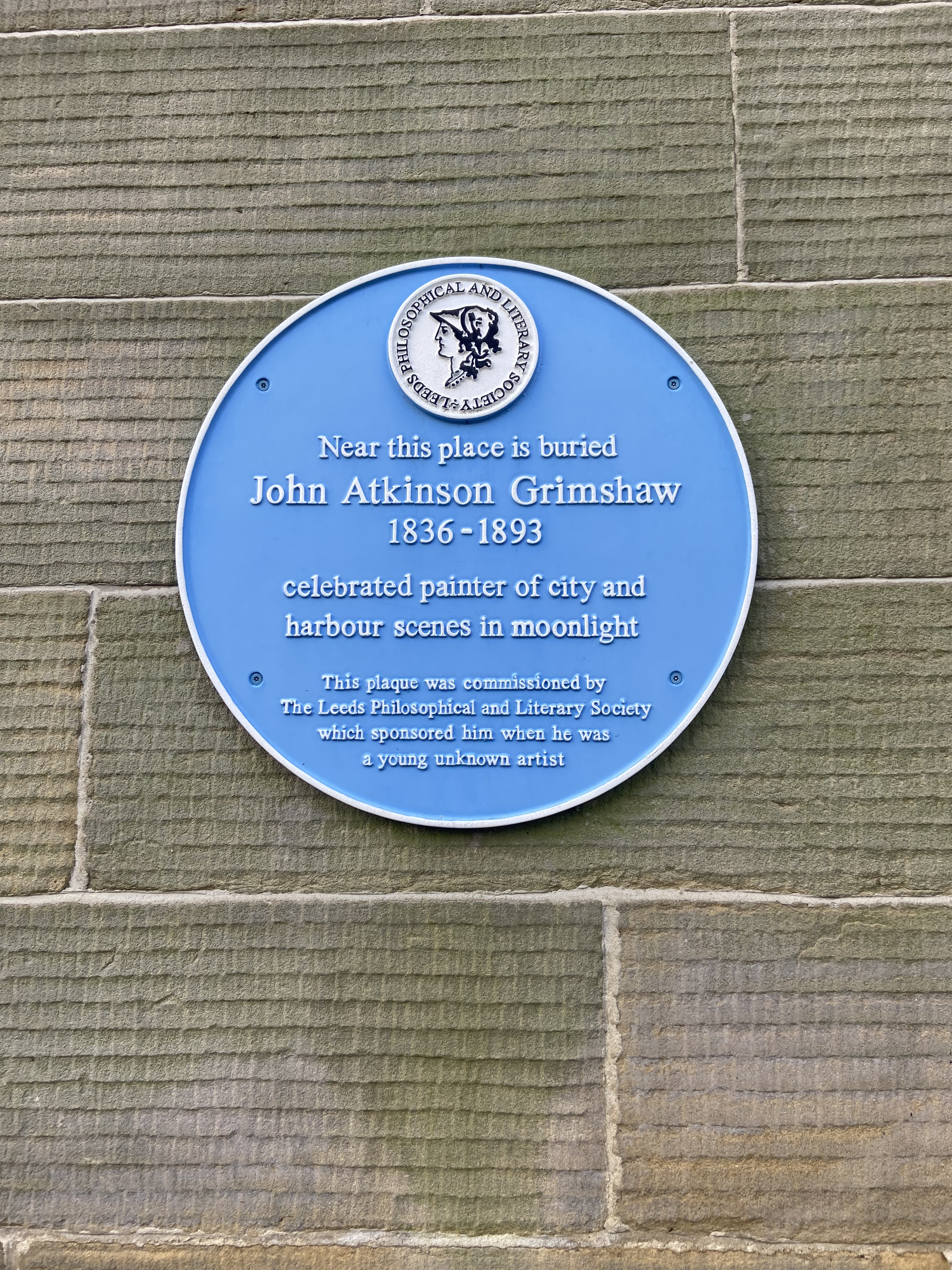
Plaque on the wall of the old crypt in St George's field referencing Atkinson Grimshaw's nearby burial
