= Bernard Walter Evans =

British painter (1843–1922)

Bernard Walter Evans R.I., R.B.A
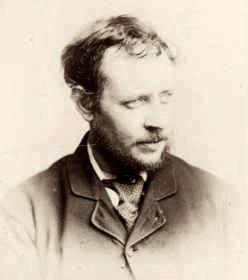
- B. W. Evans
- Born: 26 December 1843; Wolverhampton, England
- Died: 26 February 1922 (aged 78); Bedford Park, London, England
- Resting place: Harlow Hill Cemetery, Harrogate, North Riding of Yorkshire
- Education: Birmingham School of Art
- Known for: Landscape painting and watercolour painting
- Movement: Romanticism
- Father: Walter Swift Evans
- Relatives: George Eliot (cousin); Frederick Hollyer (brother in law)
- Elected: Royal Society of British Artists (1880); Savage Club (1881); Royal Institute of Painters in Water Colours (1887)

Bernard Walter Evans (26 December 1843 – 26 February 1922) was a British landscape painter and watercolourist in the Romantic style, working mainly in Birmingham, Wales, London, Cannes and the North Riding of Yorkshire. Because he used a "heavy, cumbrous" horse-drawn van to reach remote sites in Yorkshire, his nickname there was Van Evans, and he was recognisable with his wideawake hat, pipe and neckerchief. He was known for his arduous days of painting in the hard Yorkshire winters, with frozen water pots, little food, and only a paraffin stove to warm his hands.

Evans was the son of an engraver, and four of his siblings were artists. He began his apprenticeship at seven years old with Samuel Lines. He studied under George Wallis at the Birmingham School of Art and then with Edward Watson at the School of Landscape Art. He married Mary Ann Eliza Hollyer, sister of Frederick Hollyer, and one of his cousins was George Eliot. Evans was elected a member of the Royal Society of British Artists and the Savage Club, and he was for many years a member of the Royal Institute of Painters in Water Colours.

== Background ==
Bernard Walter Evans was born in Queen Street, Wolverhampton, Staffordshire England, (Note: England 1871 census RG10/1089 (or 1039) 8 East Parade, Hastings p.30. Lodgers: Samuel Hollyer widower age 73 officer of the Court of Chancery b.Coventry; Bernard W. Evans married age 29 artist b.Wolverhampton; Mary A.E. Evans married age 32 b.Bloomsbury) on 26 December 1843. (Note: The GRO index has the following: Births Dec 1843 Evans Bernard Walter Wolverhampton XVII 355. The only other registration for a Bernard Evans in England and Wales for 1843 is in Birmingham in the third quarter in the year, i.e. before the end of September, which does not match B.W. Evans' birth date of 26 December. It therefore likely that Wolverhampton was Evans' place of birth registration, and not Birmingham. Also, the Birmingham-born Bernard Evans is described as a commercial traveller in the censuses, whereas the Wolverhampton-born Bernard Walter Evans is described as an artist in the censuses.) He was the second son of Walter Swift Evans (Birmingham c.1819 – 1886), (Note: Deaths Sep 1886 Evans Walter Swift 68 Barnet 3a 114) who was an engraver on gold and silver, a copper plate engraver, and a church furniture-maker. His mother was Sophia née Spilsbury (b. Wolverhampton c.1819). (Note: Marriages Dec 1841 Spilsbury Sophia W Bromwich 18 681. England Census 1861 RG9/2154 p.40 34 Bath Street Birmingham. Walter Evans head married age 42 church furniture maker b.Birmingham; Sophia Evans wife age 42 b.Wolverhampton; Bernard Evans son age 17 b.Wolverhampton. The same parentage and birthplace information is given in the England Census 1851 HO107/2062 p.34 schedule 116 2 Burbury Street Aston Birmingham.) Evans' parents married in 1841 and had thirteen children, of whom five were artists. The artist siblings included: Edmund William Evans (1848–1908), Francis Michael Evans (1858–1937), Helen Mary Evans (1859–1947) and Wilfred Godric Evans (1860–1912). George Eliot was their cousin.

At St Luke's Church, Kentish Town, on 2 August 1870 Evans married Mary Ann Eliza Hollyer (Bloomsbury c.1832 – Knaresborough 1902), (Note: Deaths Jun 1902 Evans Mary Ann E. 70 Knaresbro' 9a 78) the daughter of an engraver and sister of Frederick Hollyer, (Note: Marriages Sep 1870 Evans Bernard Walter and Hollyer Mary Ann Eliza, Pancras 1b 83) and they lived in London, and at 20 Park Parade, Harrogate, to which they moved in the 1890s, and Evans stayed in Harrogate until around 1911. At St Catherine's Catholic Church, Frome, on 29 October 1904, Evans remarried to Mary Agnes Howard, daughter of Joseph Howard of Frome. (Note: Marriages Dec 1904 Evans Bernard Walter and Howard Mary Agnes, Frome 5c 950) Evans died at the home of his niece, in Bedford Park, London, on 26 February 1922, and was buried at Harlow Hill Cemetery, Harrogate, North Riding of Yorkshire, on 2 March 1922, alongside his wife Mary Ann Eliza.

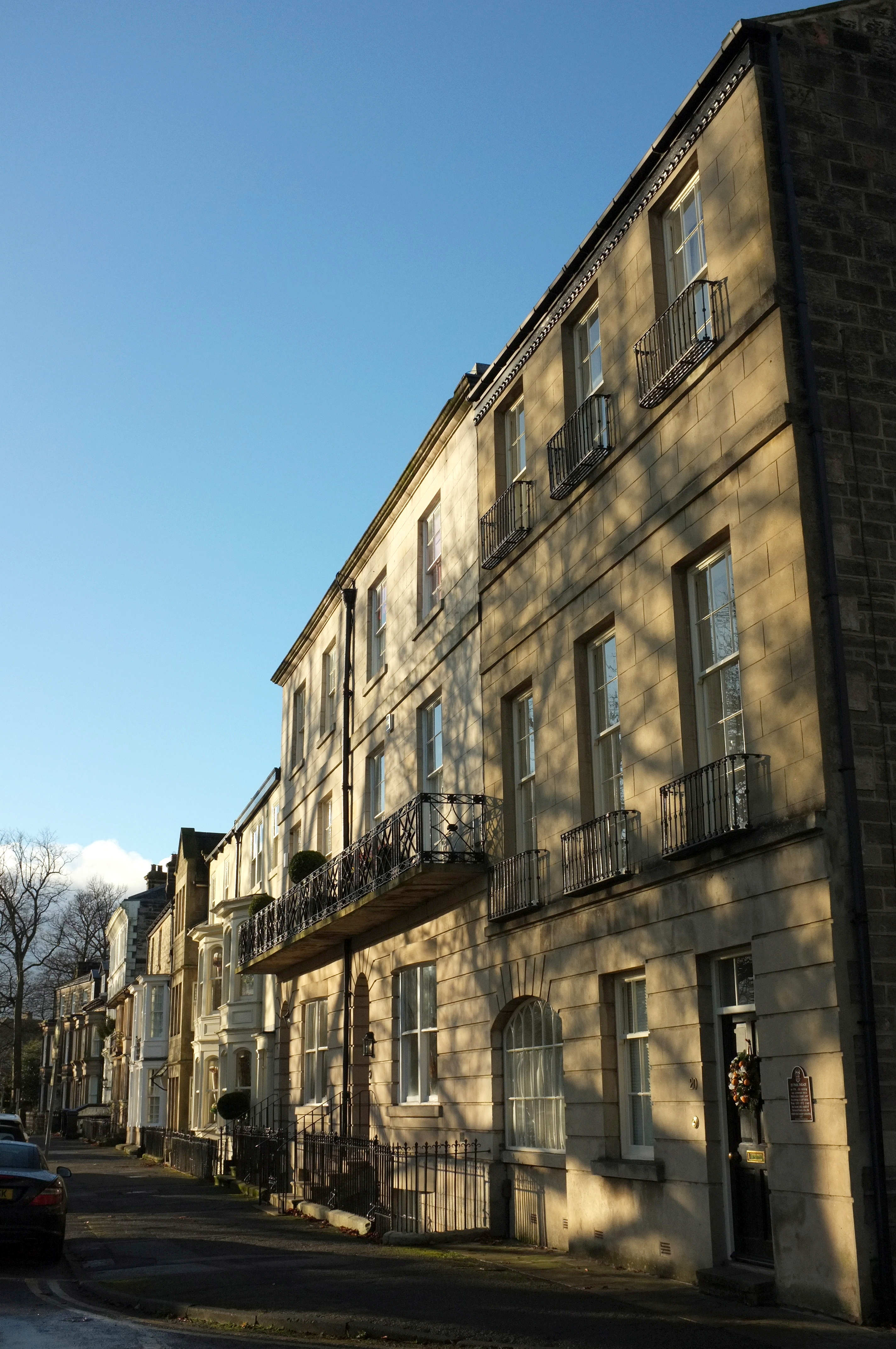
Evans' Harrogate home and studio (right)

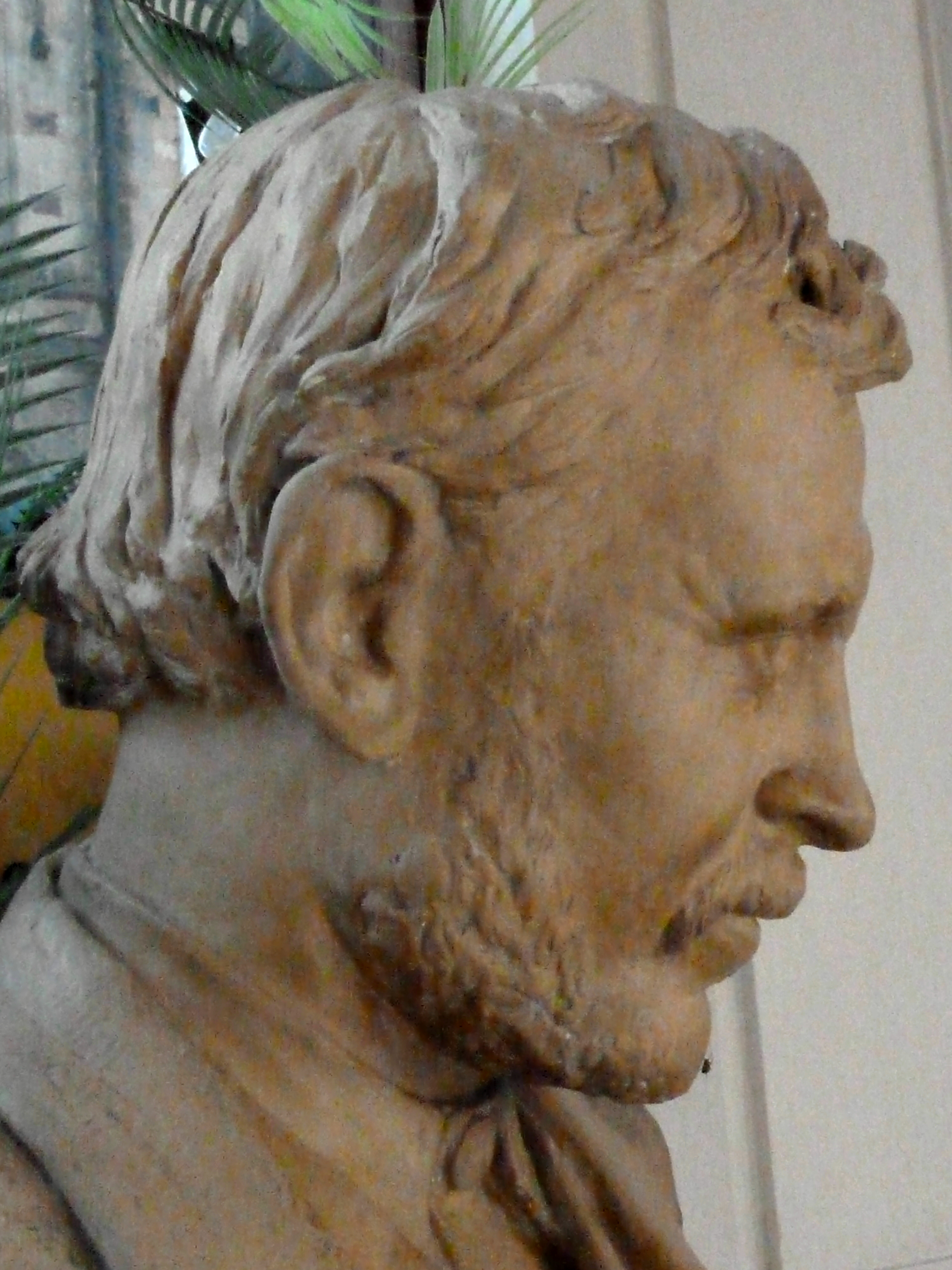
Evans by Florence Harriet Fitzgerald (c. 1888)

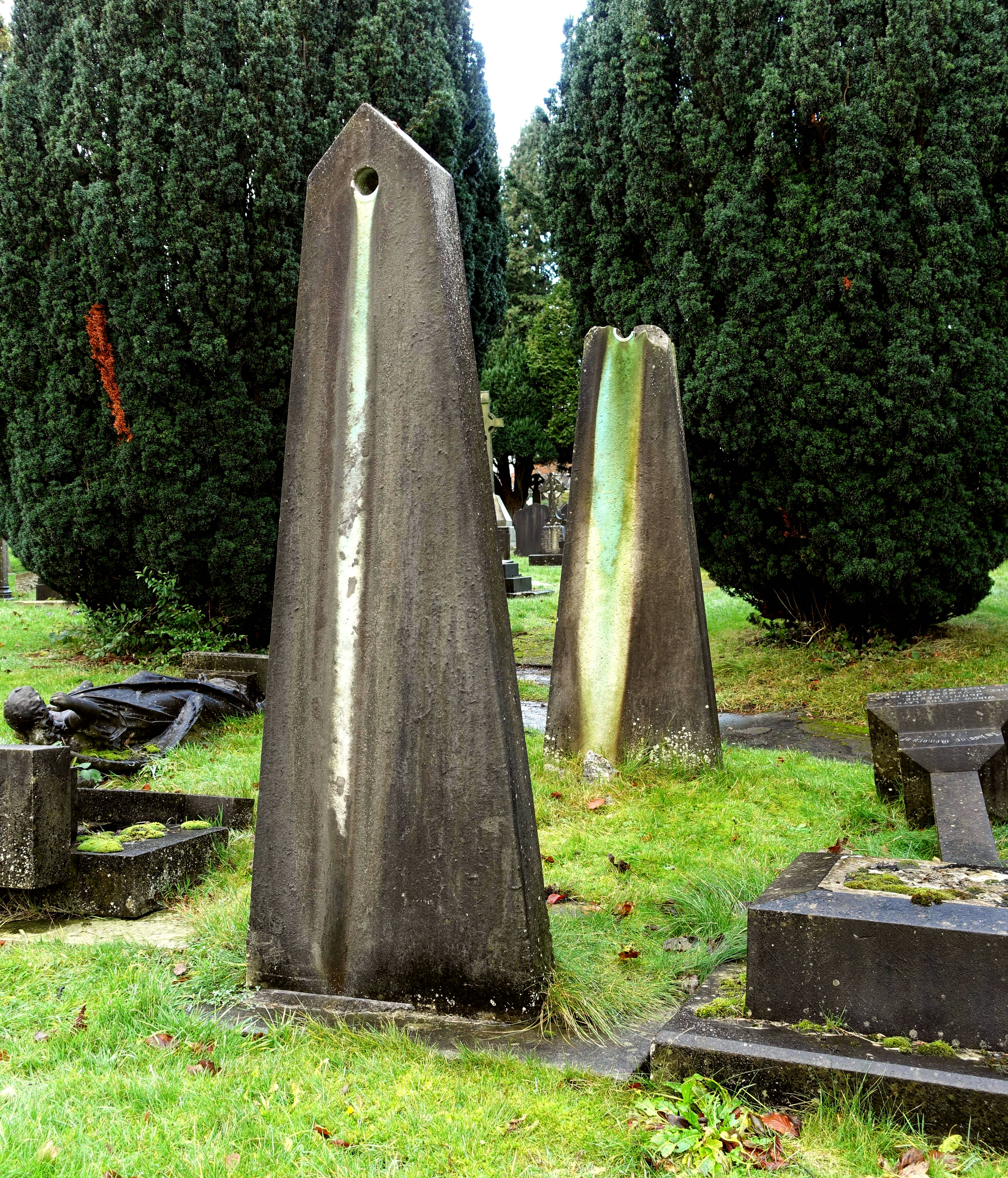
Remains of the gravestones-and-pole arrangement over the grave of Bernard and Mary Evans

== Training and career ==
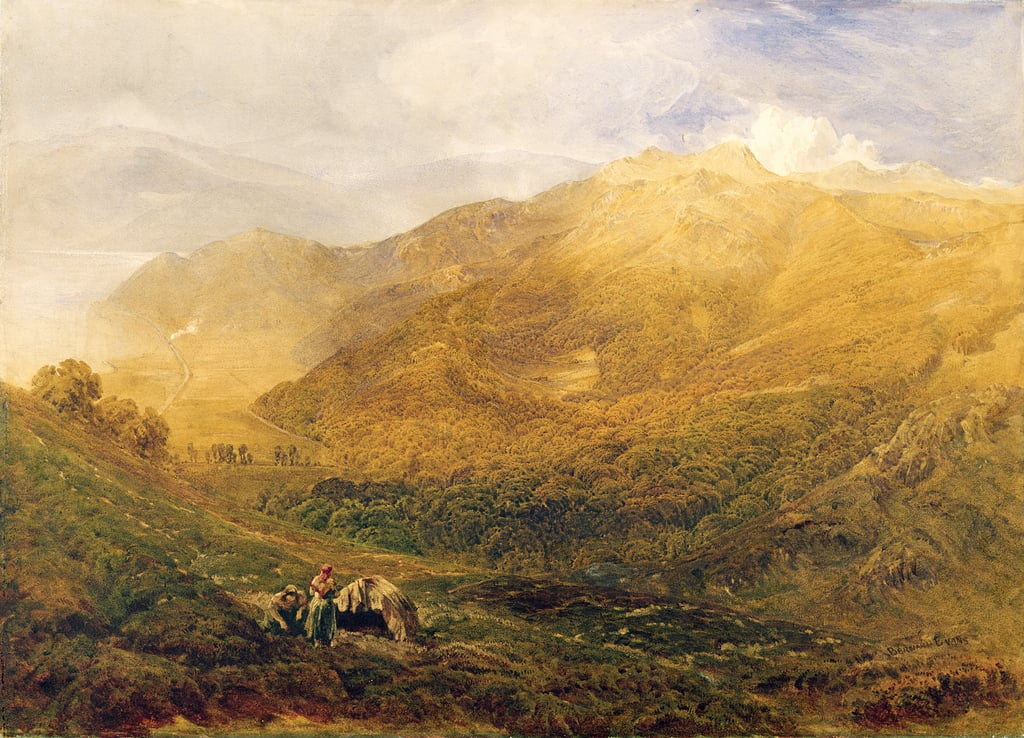
Arthog near Barmouth by B. W. Evans (undated)

Evans started studying art under Samuel Lines in Birmingham when he was seven years old, and there he "made copies of landscapes and ruins from the drawings of that artist". He then studied under George Wallis at Birmingham School of Art, (Note: Oxford Art Online says that Evans worked as an assistant to the Scottish landscape artist William Wallis in London (no mention of the Birmingham School of Art).) and from the age of nineteen in 1863 he studied under Edward Watson (died c.1920) at his School of Landscape Art. There he won several prizes of three guineas each (equivalent to £342.19 in 2025), which were spent on sketching tours in the Mawddach Estuary near Barmouth, North Wales. His father also supported his sketching tours financially. At that point in his life, Evans was receiving commendations from Edward Watson and Frederick Henry Henshaw for his work.

Evans was a landscape painter, watercolourist, and draughtsman, who "was associated with Pugin in the revival of medieval architecture", through his father Walter Swift Evans. W.S. Evans assisted Pugin in carrying out designs within the Houses of Parliament. In 1864 when B. W. Evans was 21 years old, he moved to London and "made a name for himself as a landscape artist", although he worked in the Birmingham area for much of his life. Many of Evans' landscapes were painted in Yorkshire, North Wales and the Midlands, although he and his wife spent several 1890s winters on the French Riviera where Evans painted landscapes near Cannes.

In 1880 Evans was elected to membership of the Royal Society of British Artists. He was a "driving force behind the creation" of the City of London Society of Artists in 1880, and he was elected a member of the Savage Club in 1881. He attended the first annual dinner of the Guild of Arts and Letters in London in March 1886. From 1887 until his death he was a member of the Royal Institute of Painters in Water Colours.

=== Yorkshire connection ===
On 28 February 1922, the Aberdeen Press and Journal published an obituary, which included the following reminiscence from around 1890:

Mr Evans' association with Yorkshire is of particular interest to residents in the county. He sought inspiration for many of his pictures among the beautiful surroundings of Wharfedale, travelling up and down the district in a heavy, cumbrous, four-wheeled van. That was thirty or more years ago. His picturesque figure became well known to visitors and to residents in remote, isolated spots, who bestowed on him the friendly nick-name of Van Evans. He made his headquarters in Harrogate, but was not often to be found there. For most months of the year he was in Wharfedale, where he lived a life that was almost ascetic in its simplicity. It often happened that the nearest farmstead at which he could find a lodging for the night was five or six miles from the spot at which he was working, but he was indefatigable as a pedestrian, and could be seen tramping along, pipe in mouth, to his labours, heavily booted, carelessly attired, in kneaded wideawake and unstarched linen, with a fluttering neckerchief loosely knotted about a collarless throat. The morning walk, the day's work, and the evening tramp home were one prolonged calm enthusiasm with him. Any humble little homestead which lay near a scene of beauty was good enough to find him a resting place, and his sole provision for a day's work – which, including the outward and homeward tramp, might extend over ten or twelve hours – was a bottle of new milk and a hard-boiled egg. Even his winter pictures were painted in the open, and his Bolton Abbey in the Snow was executed under something like Arctic conditions of climate. The wife of the gardener with whom he lodged at the time trudged through the deep snow every few hours with a jorum of hot coffee or hot soup. Luckily the artist and his van were for once within an easy distance of the commissariat; but even under these conditions the numbed hand stopped often, and but for a tiny portable paraffin stove the work would have been impossible. Morning after morning the water-pots were frozen when the artist reached his al fresco studio.

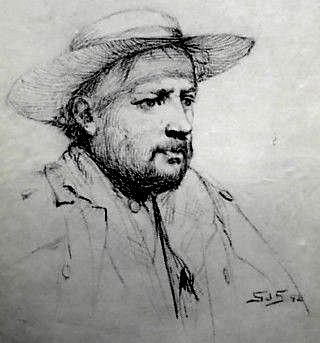
Self-portrait with wideawake hat by B. W. Evans (undated)

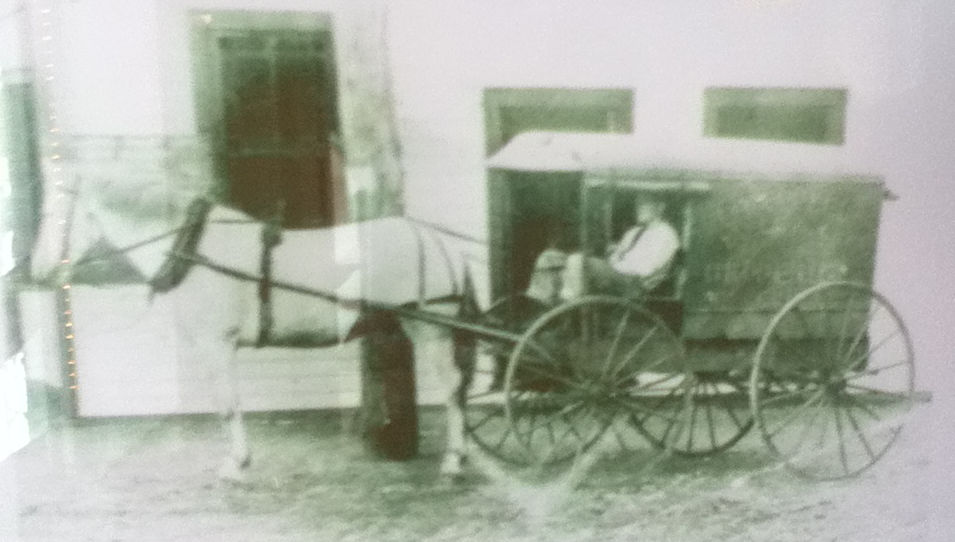
Four-wheeled horse-drawn van of the type available in 1890

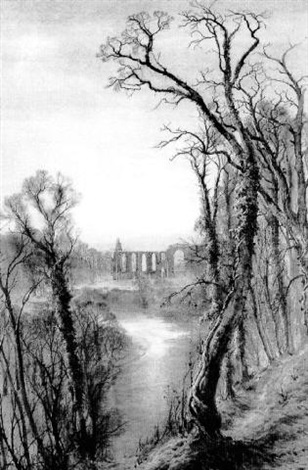
Bolton Abbey in the Snow by B. W. Evans (undated)

== Works ==
=== Exhibitions ===
Evans exhibited works with the Birmingham Society of Artists in 1864, when he was around 21 years old. When he arrived in London he found one of his watercolours on exhibition at South Kensington Museum. He exhibited at the Royal Academy summer exhibition thirteen times, never having a picture rejected, between 1871 and 1886. For the Exposition Universelle (1900) and the St Louis Exhibition 1903–1904, Evans was elected to represent English art. He also exhibited at the Royal Cambrian Academy of Art where he was one of the first 31 founder members, besides the Royal Institute of Painters in Water Colours, and the Royal Society of British Artists, Suffolk Street, London, where he exhibited 68 times.

When in Cannes, Evans gave private views of his works. He also used his Harrogate studio to exhibit his recent works; it was open to the public when he was at home. In July 1898, two large paintings in his studio were named in the Pateley Bridge and Nidderdale Herald as: Cannes From Le Grand Pin and Gorge of the Saut de Loup. Also in the studio were: On the Road to the Observatoire, Cannes, Knaresborough From the Castle Yard, The River Nidd Below Chappie Dam, Grasse From Above the Grand Hotel, The Valley of Desolation, Wharfedale, Fountains Abbey and other scenes and sketches.

=== Collections ===
At the time of Evans' death he had works in a number of permanent collections.

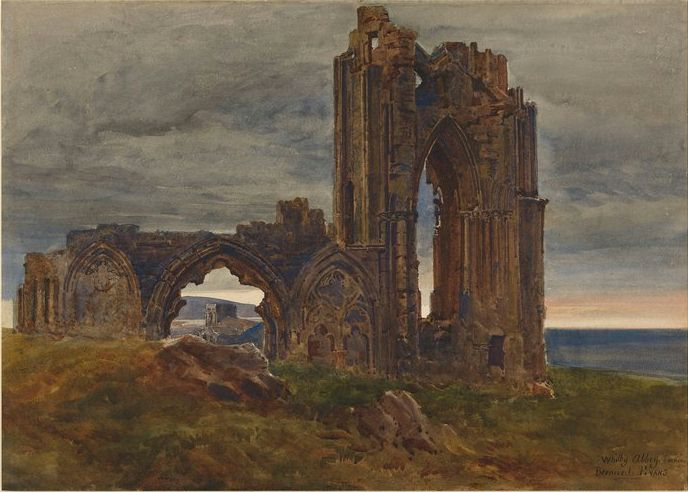
Whitby Abbey (c.1887) by B. W. Evans (Royal Collection)

- Leeds Art Gallery,
- Birmingham Art Gallery. Evans' landscape The Valley of the Trent was still hanging in Birmingham Art Gallery in 1932.
- Rotherham Art Gallery.
- Bradford Art Gallery.
- Sydney and Melbourne art galleries in Australia.
- Victoria and Albert Museum: Cannes from Le Pezou, a sketch from nature (1896).
- British Museum (South Kensington): Bolton Abbey, print, (1887).
- Mercer Art Gallery, Harrogate: Driving Home the Flock (undated) and Knaresborough (undated).
- Lytham St Anne's Art Collection: Bolton Abbey from the Soay (undated).
- Royal Collection Trust: Whitby Abbey. (c.1887).

== Reviews ==
The following reviews give an idea of how Evans was seen during his own era.

- In Evans' studio in Cannes in 1896, the Cannes Gazette, copied in the Knaresborough Post, noted the following. "Mr Evans gives us this year a more important collection of his works than he has yet exhibited at Cannes". The Gorges of the Loup was painted with "great strength and fidelity". Saint-Césaire was "another important work". Antibes was "most vividly depicted", and The Port of Cannes was a "very remarkable work".
- For some days in 1898, Evans' Harrogate studio was open to the public. The Newcastle Daily Leader, copied in the Pateley Bridge & Nidderdale Herald, published a description of some of the paintings shown. The newspaper described Cannes From Le Grand Pin as "notable ... refined ... full of light and sunshine." Gorge of the Saut de Loup was "an impressive rendering." On the Road to the Observatoire, Cannes was a "charming picture". Knaresborough from the Castle Yard was "treated with the masterly feeling of a great landscapist ... features are represented here with a truth and beauty that only Bernard Evans can compose".

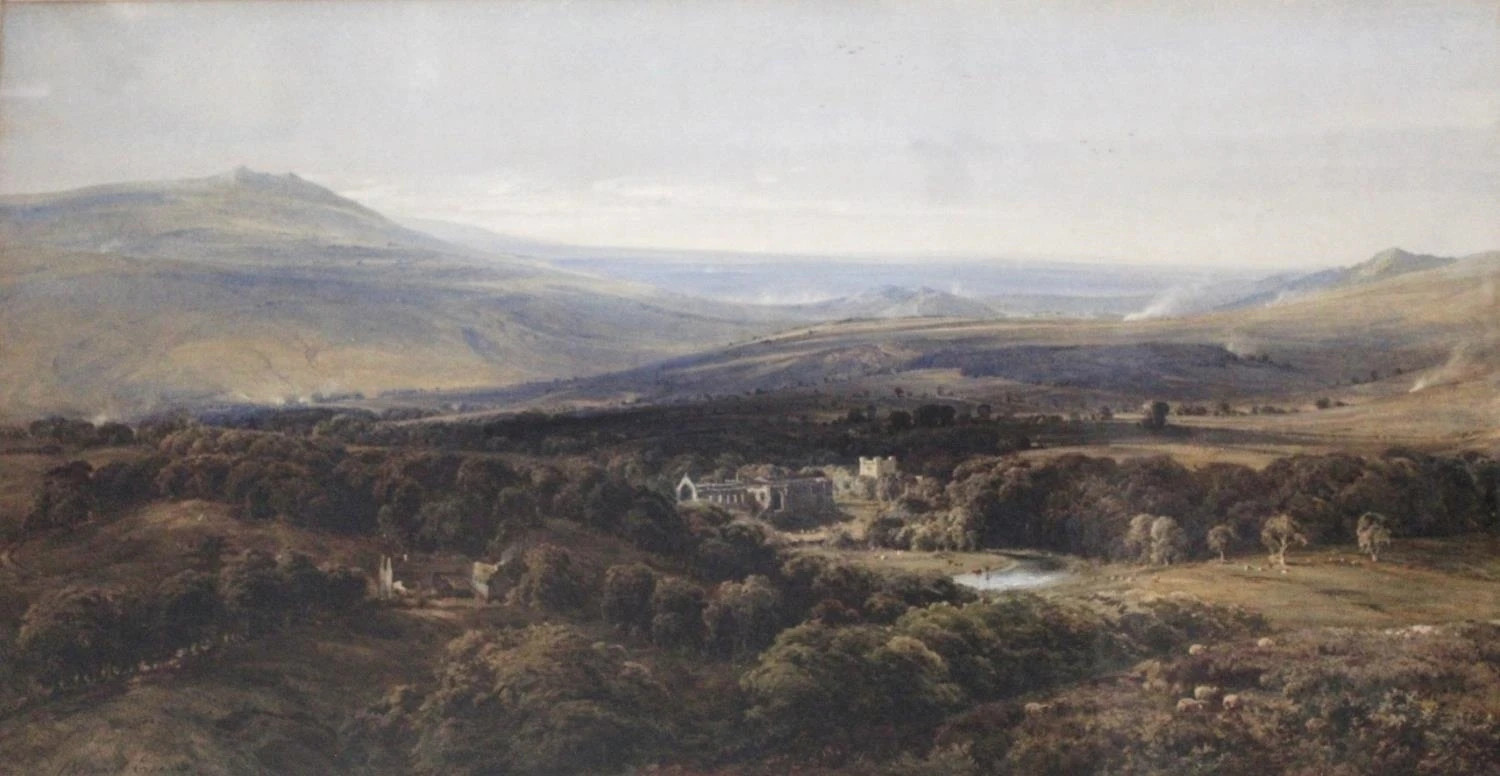
Bolton Abbey and Wharfedale by B. W. Evans (undated)

- "La Tourette forms a picturesque composition of mountain stream and arched bridge, beyond which rises a rocky eminence where the tall houses of a little town thickly congregate. Away in the distance can be seen the blue Mediterranean. Blue that sea may often be, and in La Napoule and other works Mr. Evans so pictures it, but in one of his drawings he has assigned to its waters a tone of delicate silvery grey, which merges into a broad track of brilliant white light, radiant with sunshine. The town of Cannes he has viewed from the different points, the range of the Esterelles often acting as a valuable accessory. He exhibits also several studies of English landscape, including a drawing of the pine-clad hills and the plains leading to the sea in the neighbourhood of Bournemouth. The remainder treat of Yorkshire in a manner suited to adequate exposition of the grandeur of the scenery. Knaresboro' has yielded three subjects. Fountains Abbey is depicted in the quietude of evening, and Barden Fell at a time when dusk will shortly deepen into night. Forcibly handled as all of them are, they must cede the palm to Wharfedale, for Mr. Evans excels in the representation of woodland, and here he had the opportunity of proving his skill."(Review of an exhibition of Evans' works in South Kensington, in the Knaresborough Post, 7 May 1904)

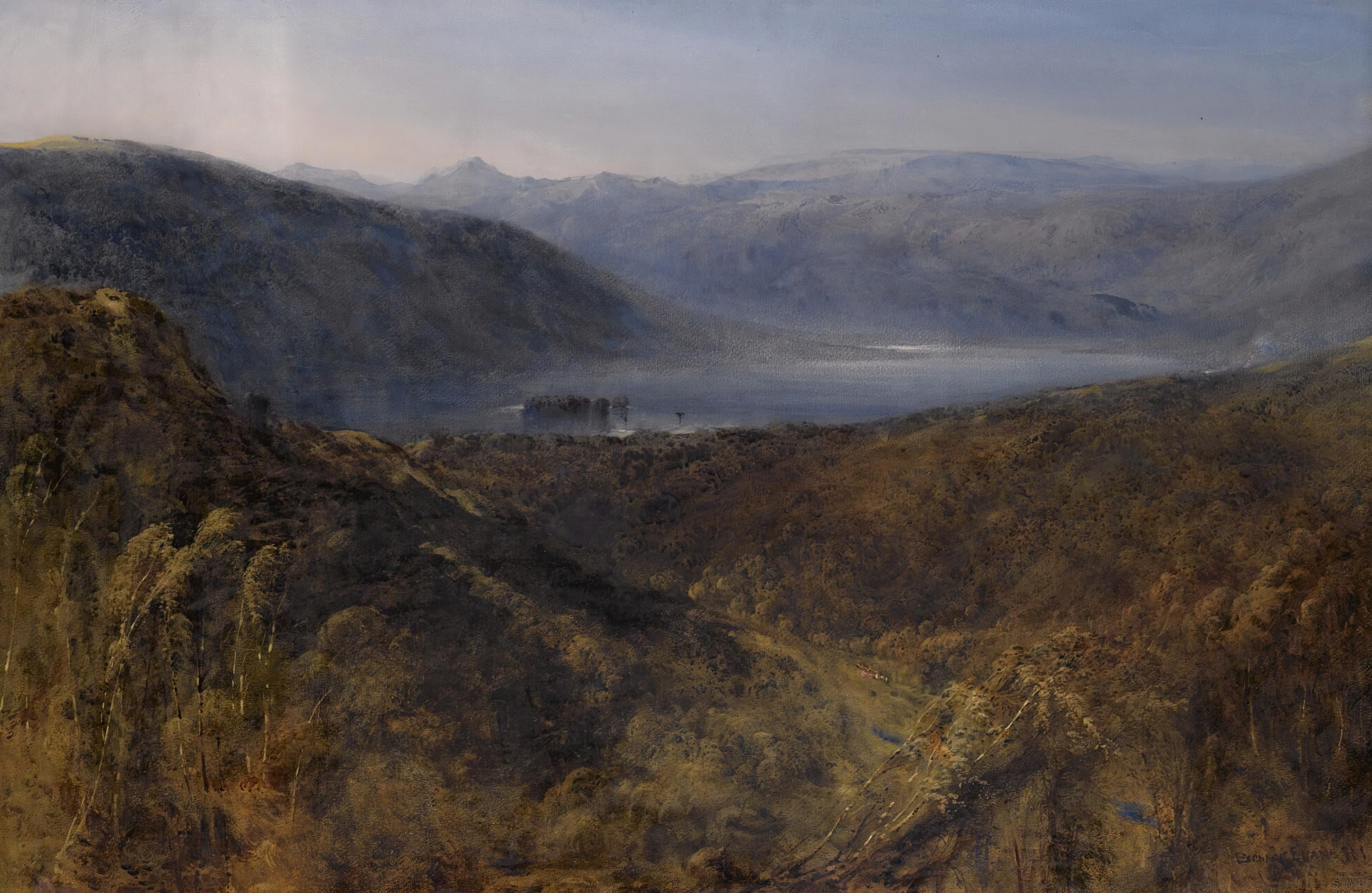
Lake Windermere by B. W. Evans (undated)

- "Among [the exhibits at the Royal Institute of Painters in Water Colours, 1898], one of the most noticeable is the contribution of Mr. Bernard Evans, R.I., which is a further proof of the strength of the position which this artist holds in the splendid line of the great masters of water-colour art. Mr. Evans's picture, which is as strong in effect as it could have been had it been painted in another medium, gives us a glimpse of Lake Windermere, behind wooded hills, and with a wonderful background of mountains. It is a fine, and indeed, noble expression of what John Ruskin calls mountain gloom ... none of so much importance as this powerfully impressive work by Mr. Evans ..." (Hendon & Finchley Times 6 June 1913)

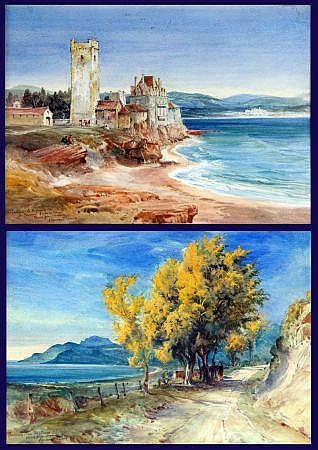
French landscapes by B. W. Evans (undated), featuring blue seas

- "The art of Bernard Evans had a peculiar distinction. It might be styled and mannered, but it was in a fine manner, recalling the classicism of such water-colour artists as Barrett and Danby, and through them reaching back to Richard Wilson and still further, to Claude. Bernard Evans always seemed most at home in such subjects as were afforded by the Italian Riviera, with its great stretches of blue sea and its serried ranks of olive trees, giving a sort of stately formality to the scene. One can imagine him following in the steps of the great artists who delighted in the somewhat theatrical grandeur of Frascati, in the broad expanses of the Roman Campagna. He did some work in the Yorkshire Dales, but it was not among his happiest; one felt that his art was too aristocratic to unbend to the homeliness of an English landscape, and one could never imagine him at his ease in the simple pastoral landscapes of Constable's Country. As one who had associations with the West Riding, it is satisfactory to know that among the recent acquisitions of the Leeds Gallery is a fine example of his work, one of the highly elaborated, finely wrought landscapes that were characteristic of him, a worthy memorial of a distinguished artist." (Yorkshire Post and Leeds Intelligencer, 28 February 1933)
- "Mr. Bernard Evans ... had little enough affinity with the newer schools of painting ... one must go back to 1870 to find him first exhibiting ... More than any other man of his time he formed a definite link with the great English painters of the water-colour school. He went straight to nature for inspiration and represented her in strong colour and with boldness of effect. Much of what he painted will survive."(Westminster Gazette 28 February 1922)
- "His pleasant pictures were panoramic rather than intimate, clear-eyed, unvexed by thought – hence their temporary popularity." (Acton Gazette, 3 March 1922)
