= The Empire of Light =

Painting series by René Magritte

The Empire of Light (Cycle)
- L'Empire des lumières (French)
- The Empire of Light (1954), Royal Museums of Fine Arts of Belgium, Brussels
- Artist: René Magritte
- Year: circa 1939 – 1967
- Medium: Oil on canvas and gouache on paper
- Movement: Surrealism
- Location: Museum Boijmans Van Beuningen, Museum of Modern Art, Peggy Guggenheim Collection, The Menil Collection, Royal Museums of Fine Arts of Belgium, Magritte Museum, and various private collections

The Empire of Light (French: L'Empire des lumières) is the title of a succession of paintings by René Magritte. They depict the paradoxical image of a nocturnal landscape beneath a sunlit sky. He explored the theme in 27 paintings (17 oil paintings and 10 gouaches) from the 1940s to the 1960s. The paintings were not planned as a formal series. They have never all been exhibited together and are rarely exhibited in smaller groups. The original French title, L'Empire des lumières is sometimes translated as singular, The Empire of Light,and sometimes as plural The Empire of Lights. Other translations include The Dominion of Light: making the distinction: "an empire exists in relation to a ruler, a dominion does not necessarily require this.”

== Precursors, influences, and origins ==
One source states the artist was inspired by the works of John Atkinson Grimshaw, an English painter from the Victorian era, who had delighted in his time to paint urban views at sunset. Other sources identify the nocturnal paintings by the Belgian symbolist William Degouve de Nuncques (1867–1935) as an influence on Magritte's series, specifically his painting The Blind House. The art historian and former director of the Kröller-Müller Museum in the Netherlands, A. M . Hammacher also observed that Magritte was "highly interested" in the landscapes of the great German romantic painter Caspar David Friedrich. William Rubin made comparisons between some of Max Ernst's frottage paintings, specifically Forest [(1927), oil on canvas 114 x 146 cm. in Joseph Slifka collection, New York at that time], commenting of Ernst's painting "the night landscape enigmatically includes a bright daylight sky (Magritte was to explore this same conjunction later in The Empire of Light II)." Comparisons with Salvador Dalí's gouache Night and Day Clothes (1936) and Max Ernst's Day and Night (1941–42) in the Menil Collection are also intriguing.

An early example of Magritte playing with the idea of the simultaneous appearance of night and day is a gouache painted in 1939 that is now in the Museum Boijmans Van Beuningen, Rotterdam. In this gouache, the horizon of a twilight sky is sharply lit by a sunset casting a group of trees and houses in the foreground in a black silhouette which is filled with stars and a crescent moon. A book on Magritte published in 1973 identifies the gouache as La Bonne Aventure (Good Fortune), however the website of the Museum Boijmans Van Beuningen gives the title as Le poison (The Poison) and states it is the first in the series The Empire of Light.

== Series ==
The Empire of Light II (1950), oil on canvas, 79 x 99 cm. Museum of Modern Art, New York

Although Magritte had already completed a few versions by 1953, a retrospective at the 1954 Venice Biennale included a 1954 version (now in the Peggy Guggenheim Collection) that attracted several collectors with expectations of buying the painting. Magritte ended up producing multiple large, high-quality versions that year to satisfy the collectors, and he continued to occasionally explore the theme in paintings for the rest of his life.

The motif was included in the designs for a series of murals in the main gaming room at the Municipal Casino at Knokke-Le Zoute in Belgium. Titled The Enchanted Domain, Magritte produced a set of eight easel sized paintings reprising and intergrading numerous themes that had appeared in his previous work. His paintings were then copied to the walls on a 1:6 scale, in a 360-degree panorama (236 ft., 71.93 m. circumference), under his supervision and completed in 1953.

Another painting from 1958, in which Magritte switched the lighting, with a sunlit landscape under a night sky is Le salon de Dieu (God's Drawing Room), oil on canvas, 43 x 59 cm., (in the private collection of Arnold Weissberger, New York in 1977). Magritte discussed the painting in an undated letter to Suzi Gablik stating: "I'd like to tell you I've brought off a very difficult picture, but which is probably too difficult to be successful? It involves a painting of a daylit landscape with a nocturnal sky (stars and crescent moon). I've painted and repainted this picture and I'm at the disenchanted stage, It's a total failure! A friend found as title Le salon de Dieu (God's Drawing Room): I hesitated a long time in adopting it; a title such as Le bal masqué (The Masked Ball) seemed preferable to me for many reasons, the main one being the total ban on saying anything at all about God. But to see it and reproduce it in paint is possible only if one is a God. While waiting to become one, I'm abandoning the project."

In November 2024, one of the 1954 paintings from the series set a new auction record for the artist, selling for $121.16 million at Christie's in New York. This sale surpassed Magritte's previous record of $79 million set in 2022. It was one of the largest pieces in the series, and had been valued at $95 million prior to the auction. The work was part of the collection of interior designer Mica Ertegun, and was described by Christie's as the "crown jewel" of her holdings. The sale set a world record for both Magritte and surrealist works at auction.

== Quotes from the artist and André Breton ==
Magritte commented on the paintings in a televised interview in 1956, about the time he received his Guggenheim Prize.

For me, the conception of a painting is an idea of one thing or several things that can become visible through my painting. It is understood that all ideas are not conceptions for pictures. Obviously, an idea must be sufficiently stimulating for me to undertake to paint faithfully the thing or things I have ideated.

The conception of a picture, that is, the idea, is not visible in the picture: an idea cannot be seen with the eyes. What is represented in a picture is what is visible to the eyes, it is the thing or things that must have been ideated. Thus, what are represented in the picture The Empire of Light are the things I ideated, i.e. a nighttime landscape and a sky such as we see during the day. The landscape evokes night and the sky evokes day. I call this power: poetry.

If I believe this evocation has such poetic power, it is because among other reasons, I have always felt the greatest interest in night and in day, yet without ever having preferred one or the other. This great personal interest in night and day is a feeling of admiration and astonishment.

In 1964, John and Dominique de Menil organized an exhibition of Magritte's work in Houston, Texas. The Belgian surrealist attended the exhibit, replete in an incongruous cowboy hat and boots. André Breton wrote the introduction for the exhibition catalogue and commented on the Empire of Light paintings.

Rene Magritte's work and thought could not fail to come out at the opposite pole from the zone of facility – and of capitulation – that goes by the name of "chiaroscuro." To him, inevitably, fell the task of separating the "subtle" from the "dense", without which effort no transmutation is possible. To attack this problem called for all his audacity – to extract simultaneously what is light from the shadow and what is shadow from the light (L'Empire des Lumieres). In this work the violence done to accepted ideas and conventions is such (I – Breton – have this from Magritte) that most of those who go by quickly think they saw the stars in the daytime sky.

== Partial list of paintings related to The Empire of Light ==
The Empire of Light (1954), oil on canvas, 195.4 x 131.2 cm., Peggy Guggenheim Collection, Venice

- Good Fortune or The Poison (1939), gouache, 33.6 x 40.6 cm., Museum Boijmans Van Beuningen, Rotterdam.
- The Empire of Light (1948), 100 x 80 cm., private collection, Brussels, Belgium*
- The Empire of Light II (1950), 79 x 99 cm. Museum of Modern Art, New York, New York (Gift of the Menils)
- The Empire of Light III (1951), 78.7 x 66 cm., William Alexander, New York, New York*
- The Empire of Light (1953), 37 x 45 cm. Arnold Weissberger, New York, New York*
- The Empire of Light (1954), 195.4 x 131.2 cm., Peggy Guggenheim Collection, Venice, Italy
- The Empire of Light VIII (1954), 129.9 x 94.6 cm., The Menil Collection, Houston, Texas
- The Empire of Light (1954), 146 x 114 cm., Royal Museums of Fine Arts of Belgium, Brussels, Belgium
- The Empire of Light (1958), 49.5 x 39.5 cm., New York, New York*
- God's Salon (1958), 43 x 59 cm., Arnold Weissberger, New York*
- The Empire of Light (1961), 114 x 146 cm., private collection, Brussels, Belgium*
- The Empire of Light (no date), private collection, Brussels, Belgium*
- The Empire of Light (1967, unfinished), 45 x 50 cm., Magritte Museum, Brussels, Belgium

All works are oil on canvas unless noted otherwise. An asterisk (*) indicates the collection based on a 1977 publication and may not reflect the current collection.

== In popular culture ==
The paintings inspired a scene in the 1973 horror film The Exorcist, which was used on the film's posters and home video releases, in which the character Father Merrin stands in front of the MacNeil family's house, lit by a street light but without a daylit sky. It also inspired the artwork for the cover of Jackson Browne's 1974 album Late for the Sky.

The painting also appears in the second episode of the first season of the Korean drama series Squid Game, when the character Jun-ho is searching his missing brother's apartment.

== Gallery of comparative paintings ==
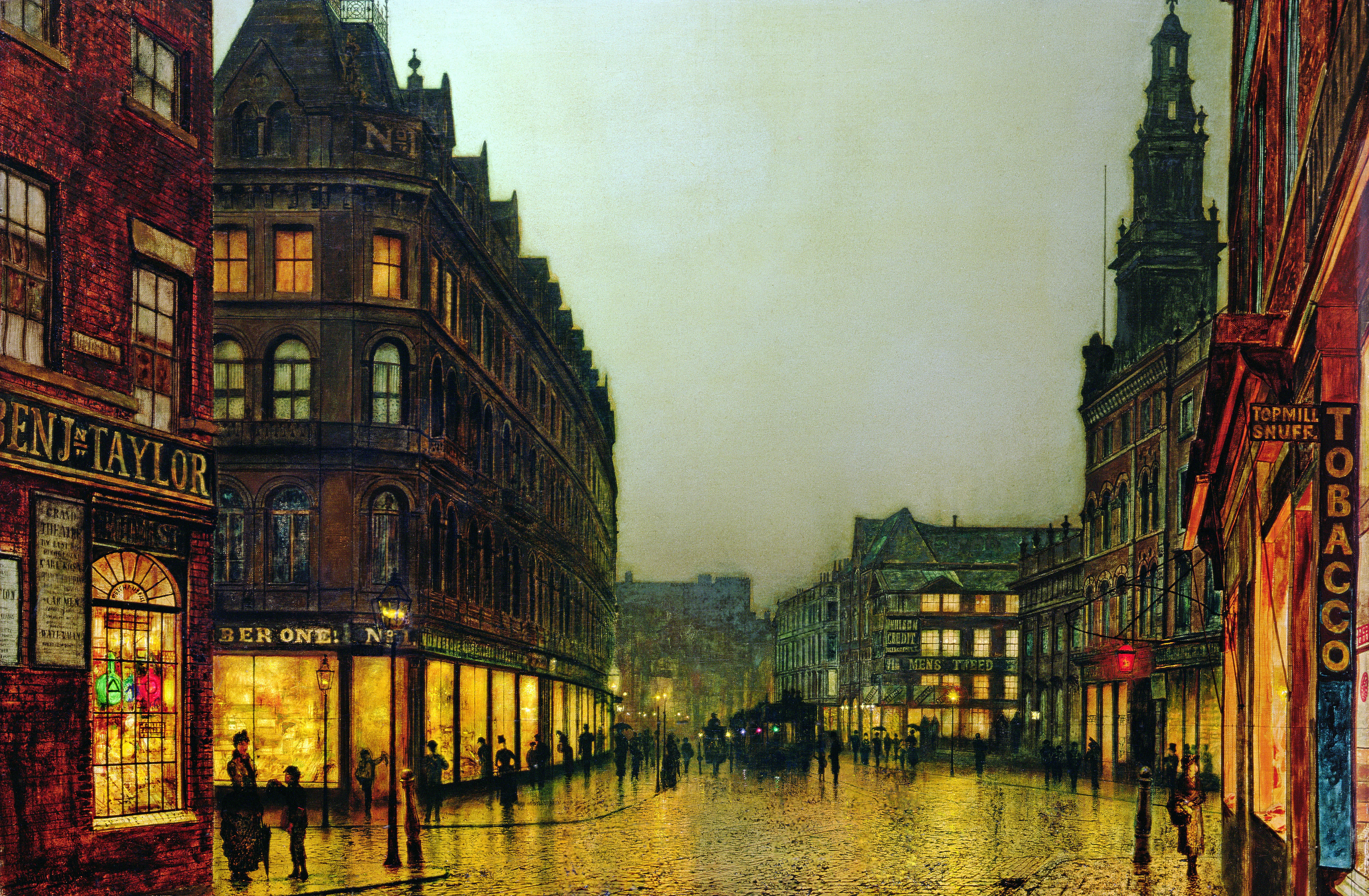
John Atkinson Grimshaw, Boar Lane, Leeds, 1880s

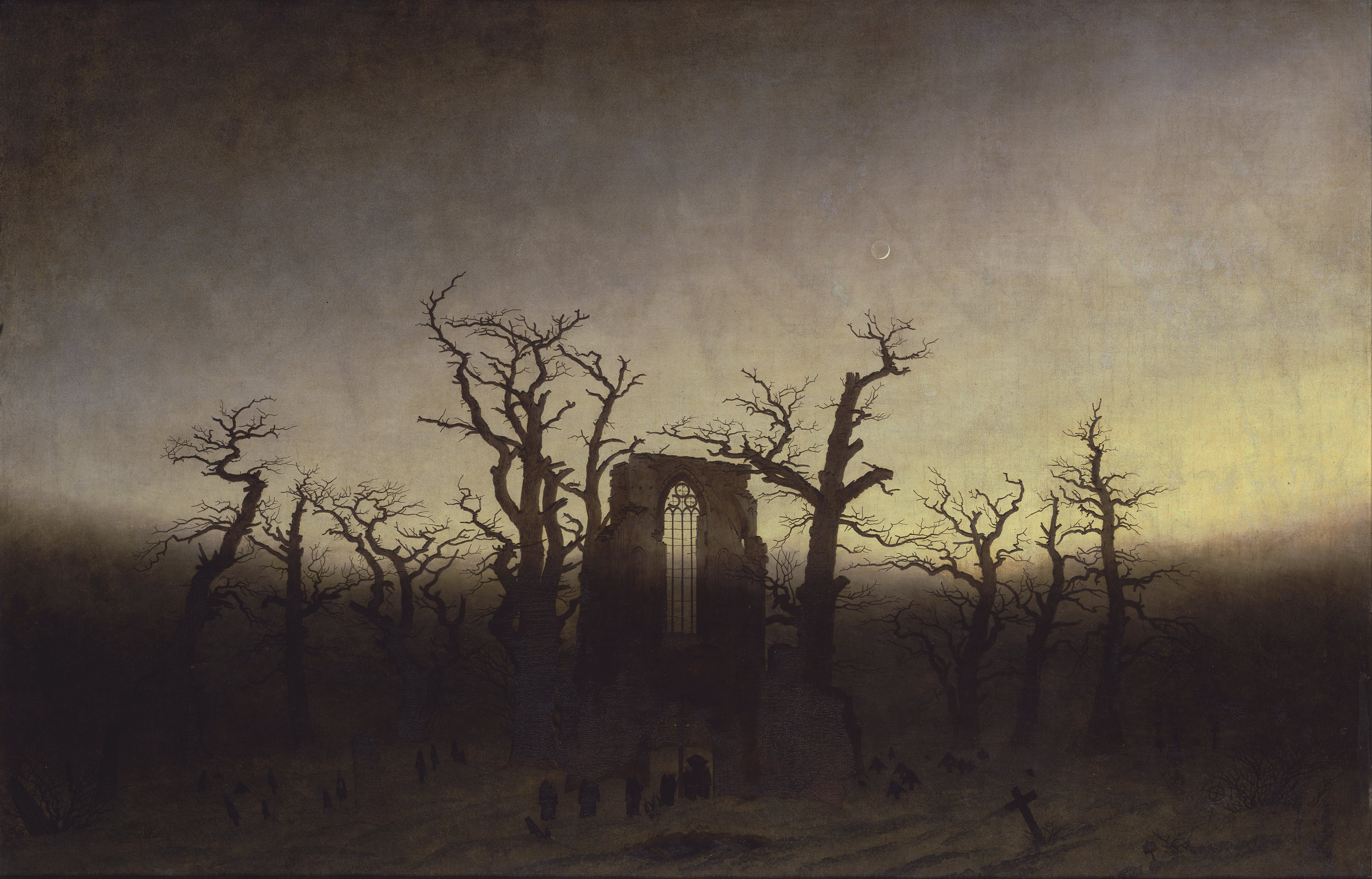
Caspar David Friedrich, Abbey in the Oakwood (1809–10), oil on canvas, 171 x 110.4 cm., Alte Nationalgalerie, Berlin

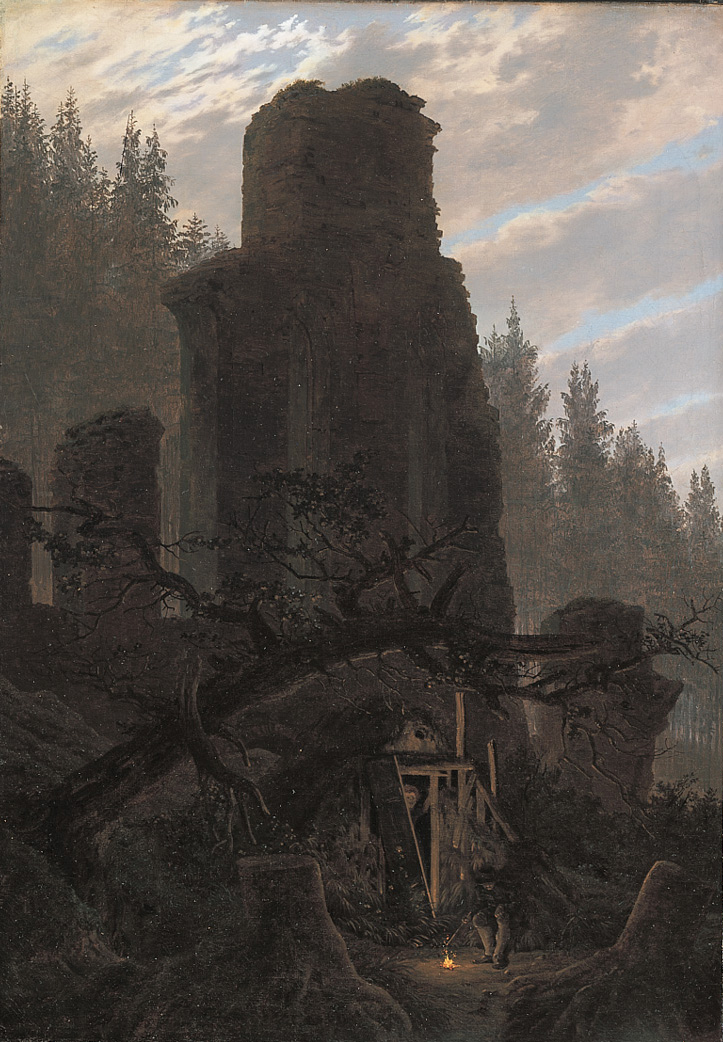
Caspar David Friedrich, Church ruin in the forest (c. 1831), oil on canvas, 70.5 x 49.7 cm., Neue Pinakothek, Munich

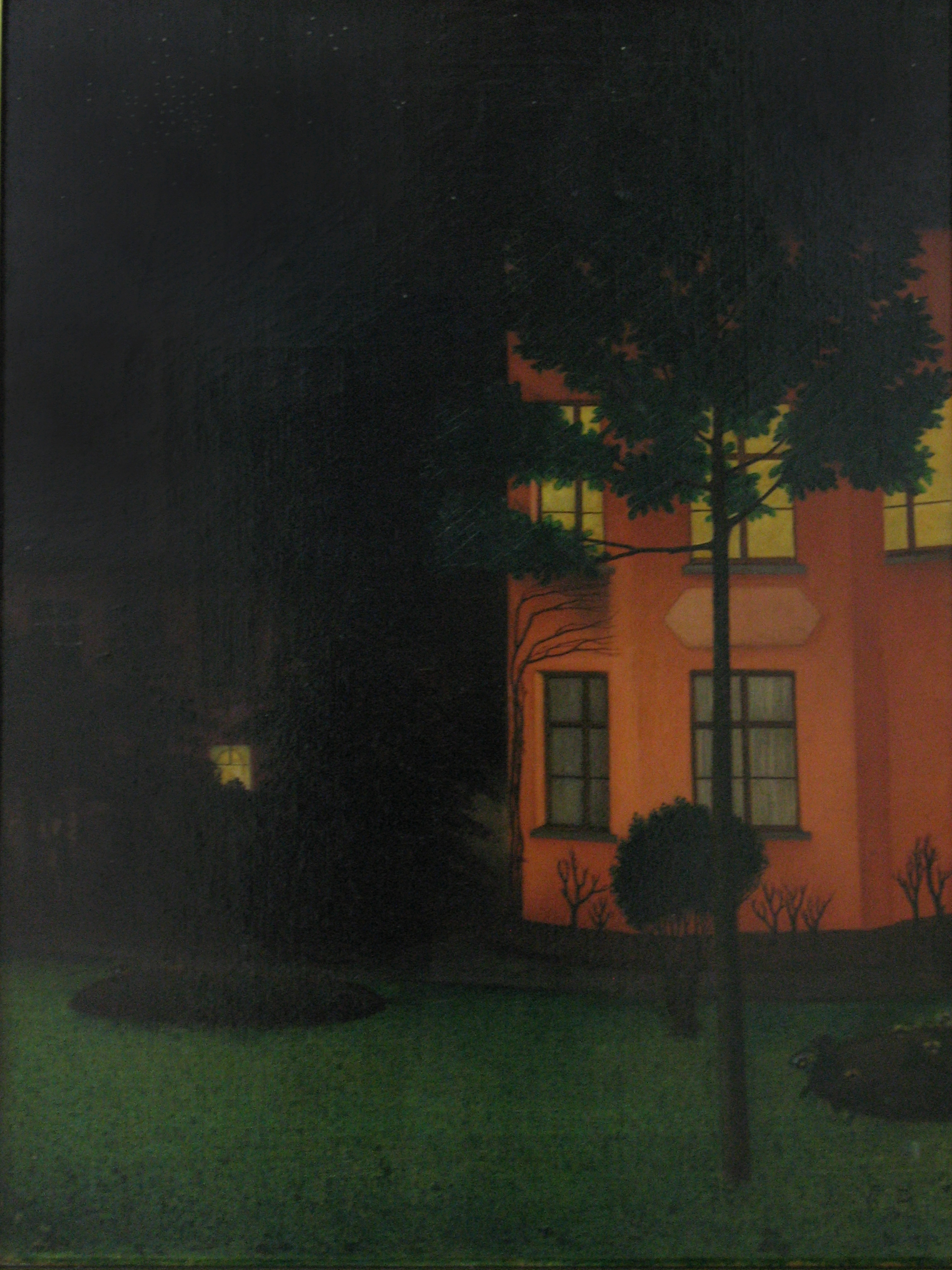
William Degouve de Nuncques, The Blind House (1892), oil on canvas, Kröller-Müller Museum, Otterlo

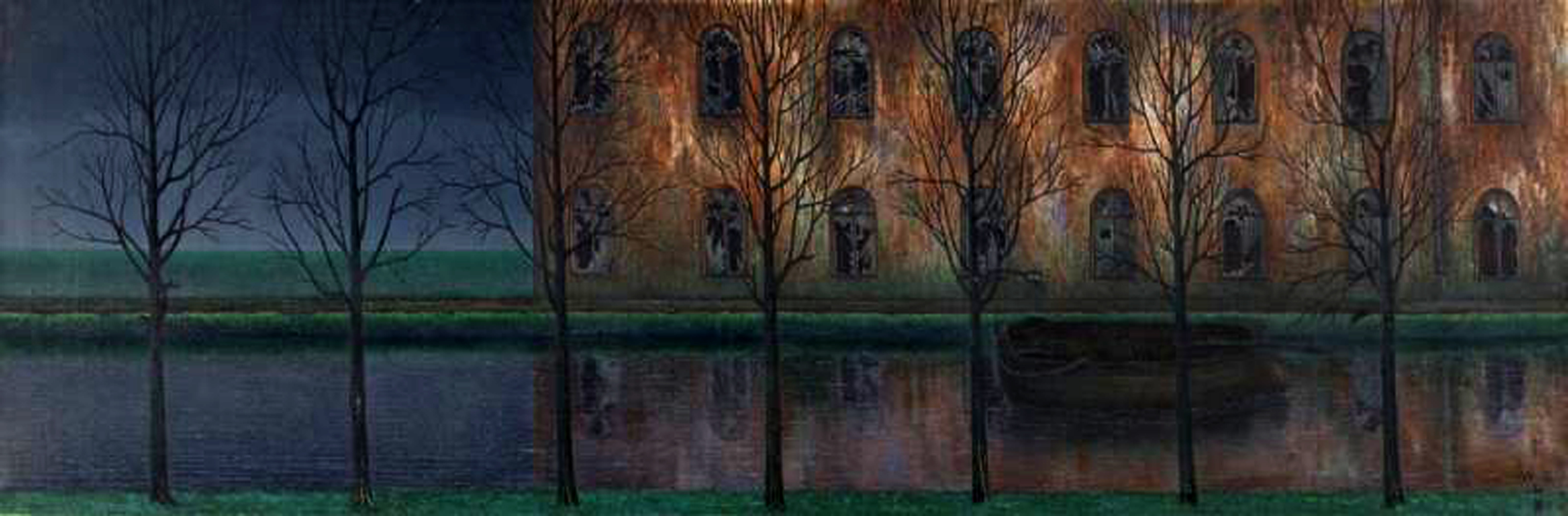
William Degouve de Nuncques, The Canal (1894), oil on canvas, 42,4 x 122,5 cm., Kröller-Müller Museum, Otterlo

== See also ==
- List of paintings by René Magritte
- 100 Great Paintings, 1980 BBC series
