= Frederick Henshaw =

Frederick Henshaw may refer to:

- Frederick Henry Henshaw (1807–1891), English artist
- Frederick W. Henshaw (1858–1929), American attorney and judge
