= Boar Lane =

Street in Leeds, England

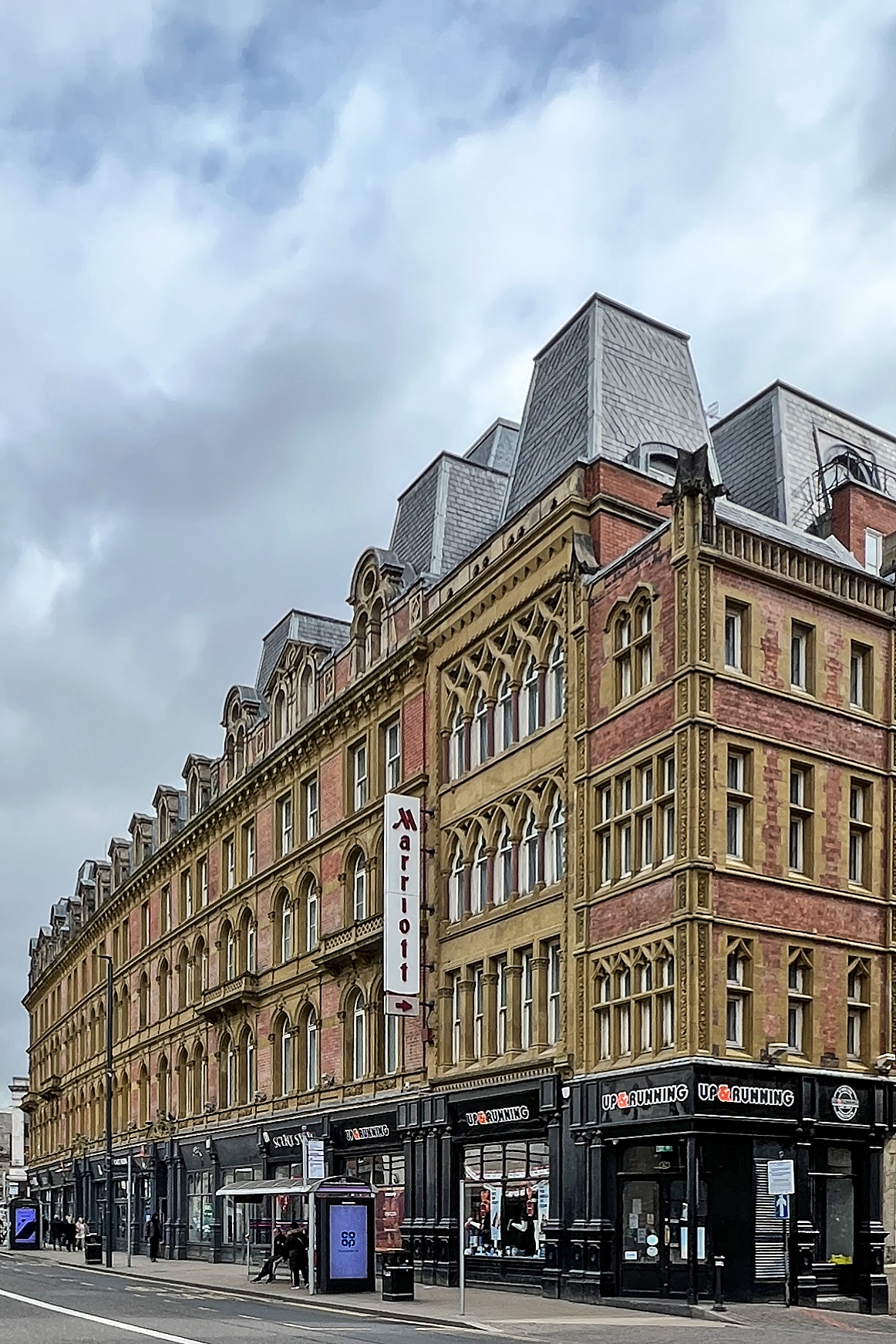
Buildings on the south side of Boar Lane, in 2022

Boar Lane is a street in the city centre of Leeds, in England.

== History ==
The street originated in the Medieval period, running between the town's manor house and the main street of Briggate, its name believed to be a corruption of the word "borough".

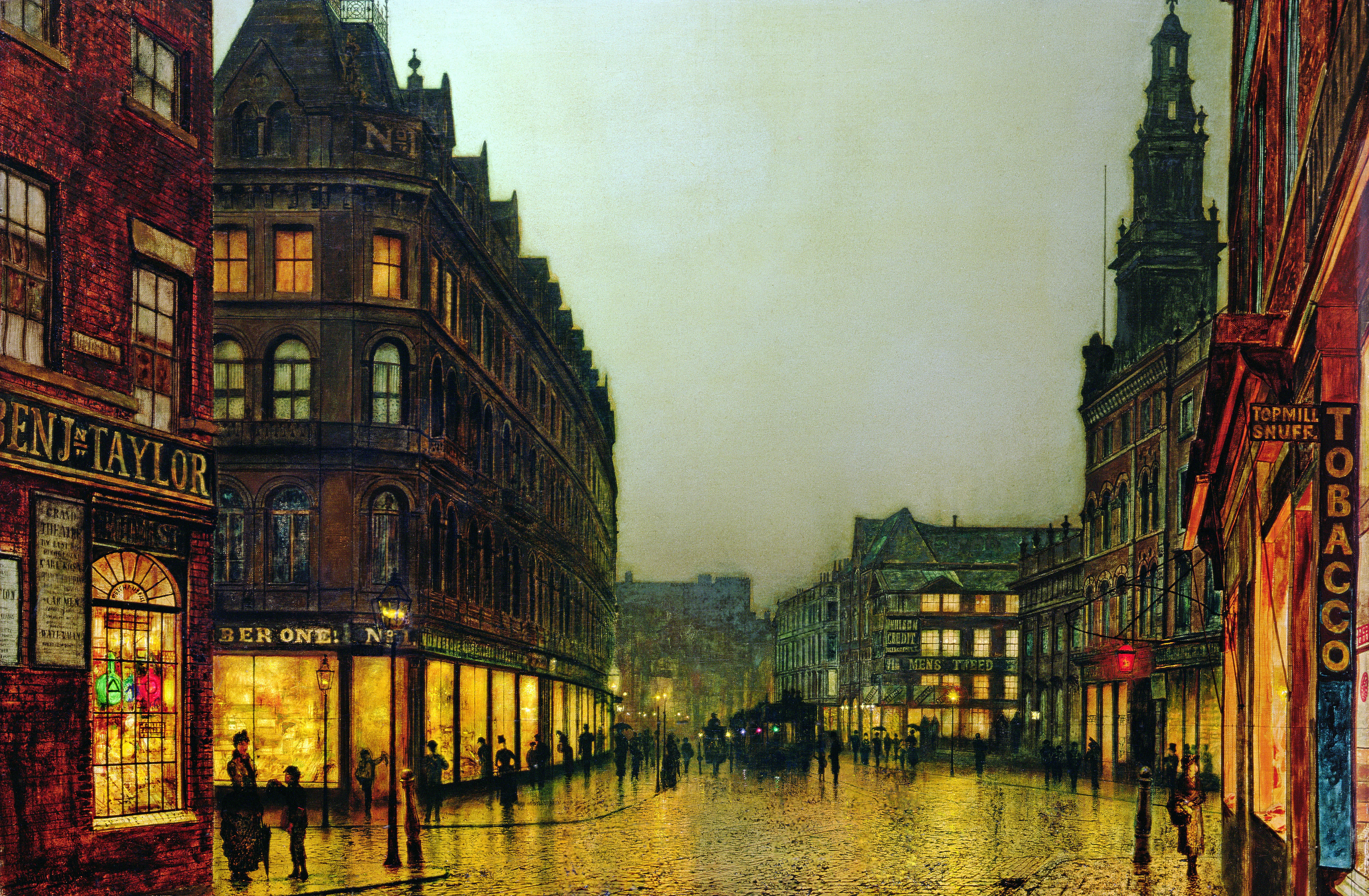
Boar Lane, Leeds by John Atkinson Grimshaw, 1881

By the 18th century, the street was entirely built up. Between 1869 and 1876, it was widened, to provide better access to the New and Wellington railway stations. This entailed the demolition of all the buildings on the southern side of the road. Most of the buildings on the northern side were demolished in the late 1960s, to enable the construction of a new shopping centre.

== Layout and architecture ==
The street runs east from City Square to a junction with Briggate, Lower Briggate and Duncan Street. Lower Basinghall Street and Albion Street lead off its north side, while Mill Hill, New Station Street and Trevelyan Square run off its south side.

The north side of the street is dominated by the Trinity Leeds shopping centre. Other notable buildings include the grade I listed Holy Trinity Church, the terrace of 58 to 63 Boar Lane, and 71 Boar Lane. On the south side are 40 Boar Lane, the Griffin Hotel, 29 Boar Lane, the Victoria Buildings, Ambler House, and 1–13 Boar Lane.
