= Wideawake hat =

Brimmed felt head covering

A wideawake hat is a broad brimmed felt "countryman's hat" with a low crown, similar to a slouch hat. A wideawake hat is most commonly seen in dark shades of cloth, such as dark brown or black felt. The brim is fairly wide, and is flat in front and back but with a moderate upturn on the left and right sides. The brim may be asymmetric from side to side, as seen in the Rembrandt portrait, or symmetrical, as seen in the Quaker Oats logo. If asymmetric, it is more similar to a slouch hat, which has one side pinned to the crown and the other side allowed to droop. The top is styled flatly, rather than in a bowler curve. A hatband at the base is common. The name may derive from a humorous pun – the hat "never had a nap, and never wants one".

== History and portrayals ==
The best-known portrayals of a wideawake hat are two self-portraits by Rembrandt from 1632.

In the United States, wideawake hats have also been known as "Quaker hats", after their adoption by Quakers in the 17th century. A well-known depiction of this style is part of the logo for Quaker Oats. It was also associated with the Wide Awake Party, an abolitionist Republican Party affiliate organization in the 1860s in the United States.

The hat gained in popularity in the Victorian era, and was adopted in the 20th century as part of the dress uniform for some British boy-scouting organizations. Photos of Alfred, Lord Tennyson (1809–1892), in a wideawake hat are the best-known images of the young Tennyson.

== Historical figures in wideawake hats ==
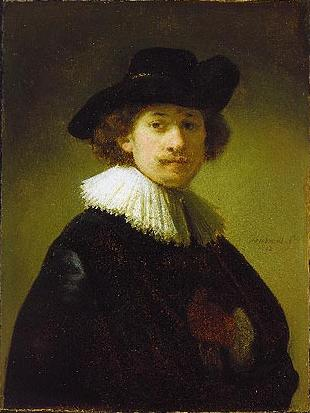
Rembrandt

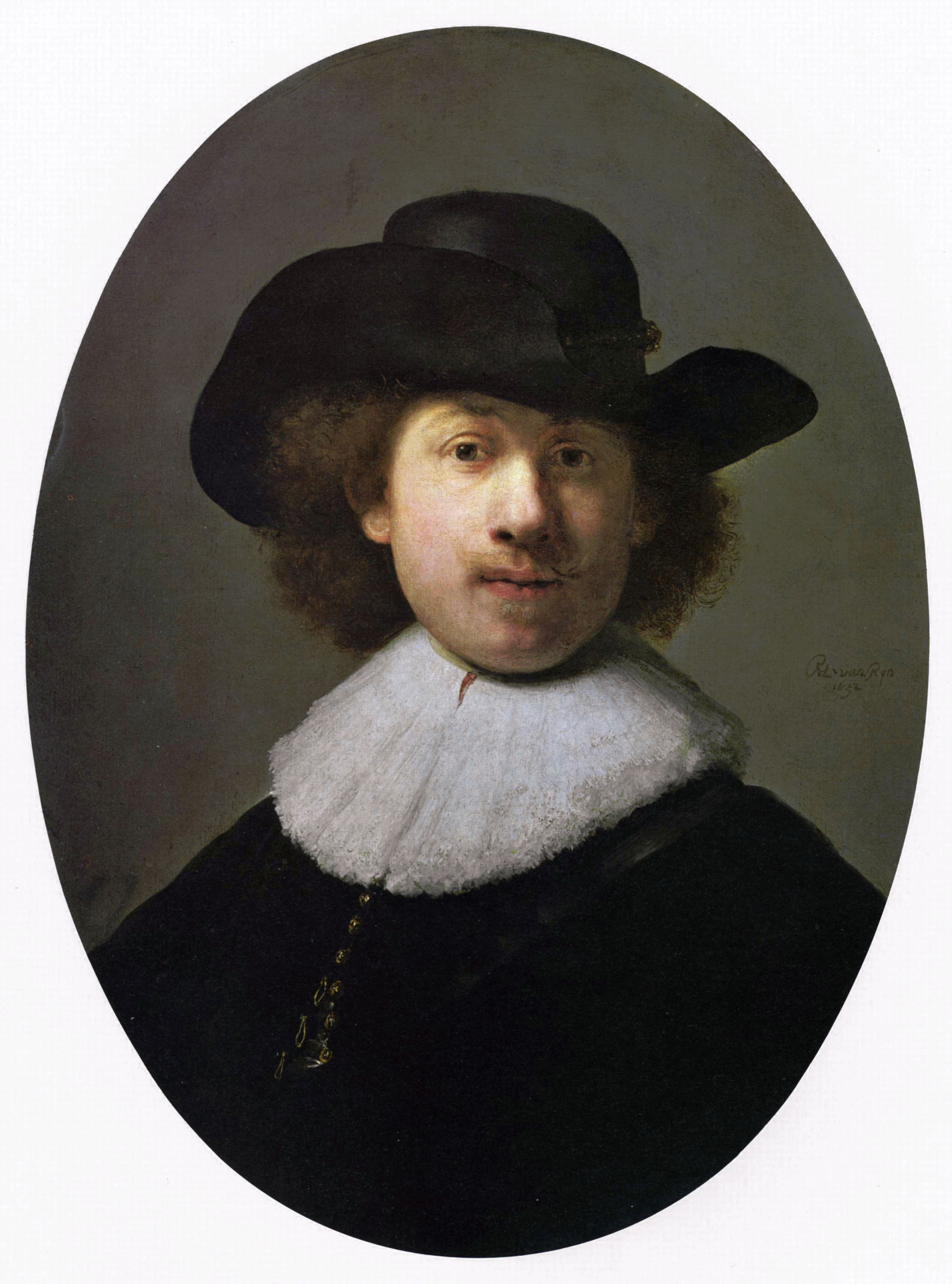
Rembrandt

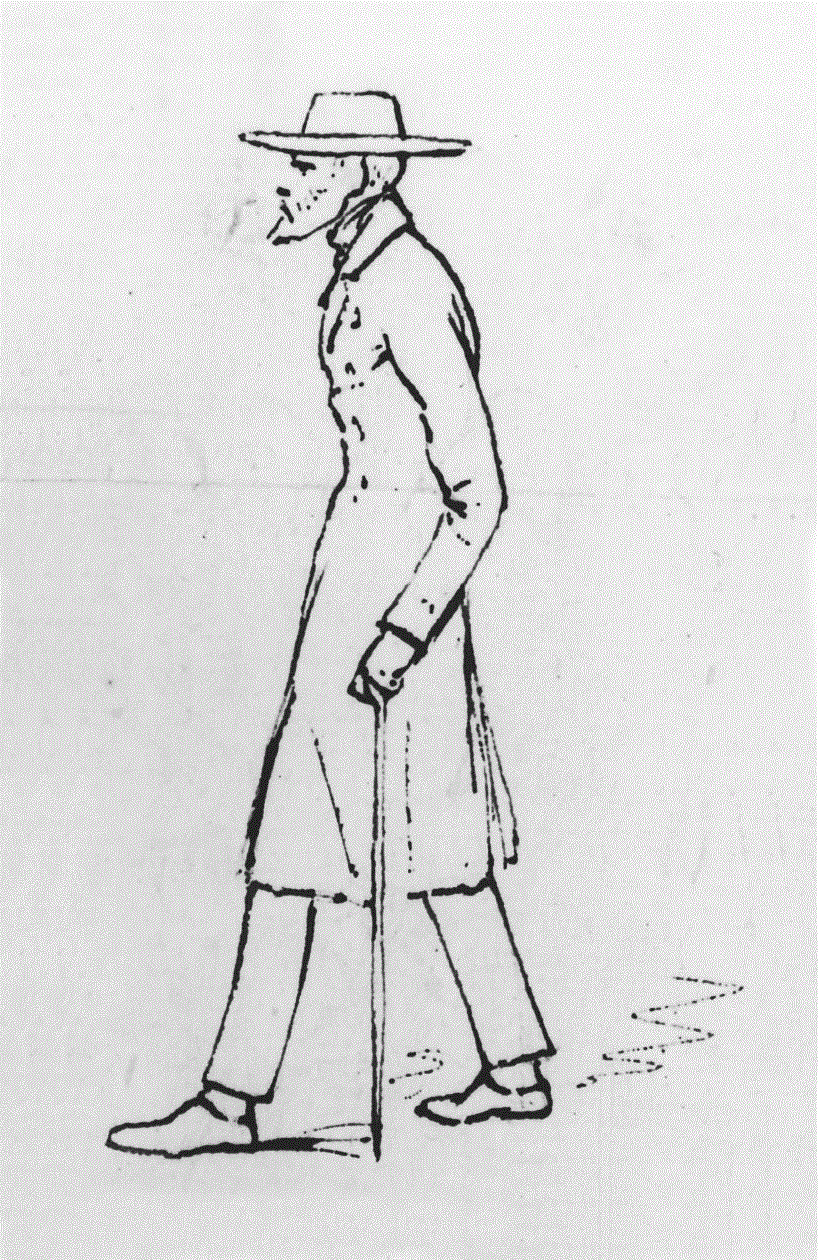
Thomas Carlyle on a midnight ramble by Charles Bell Birch

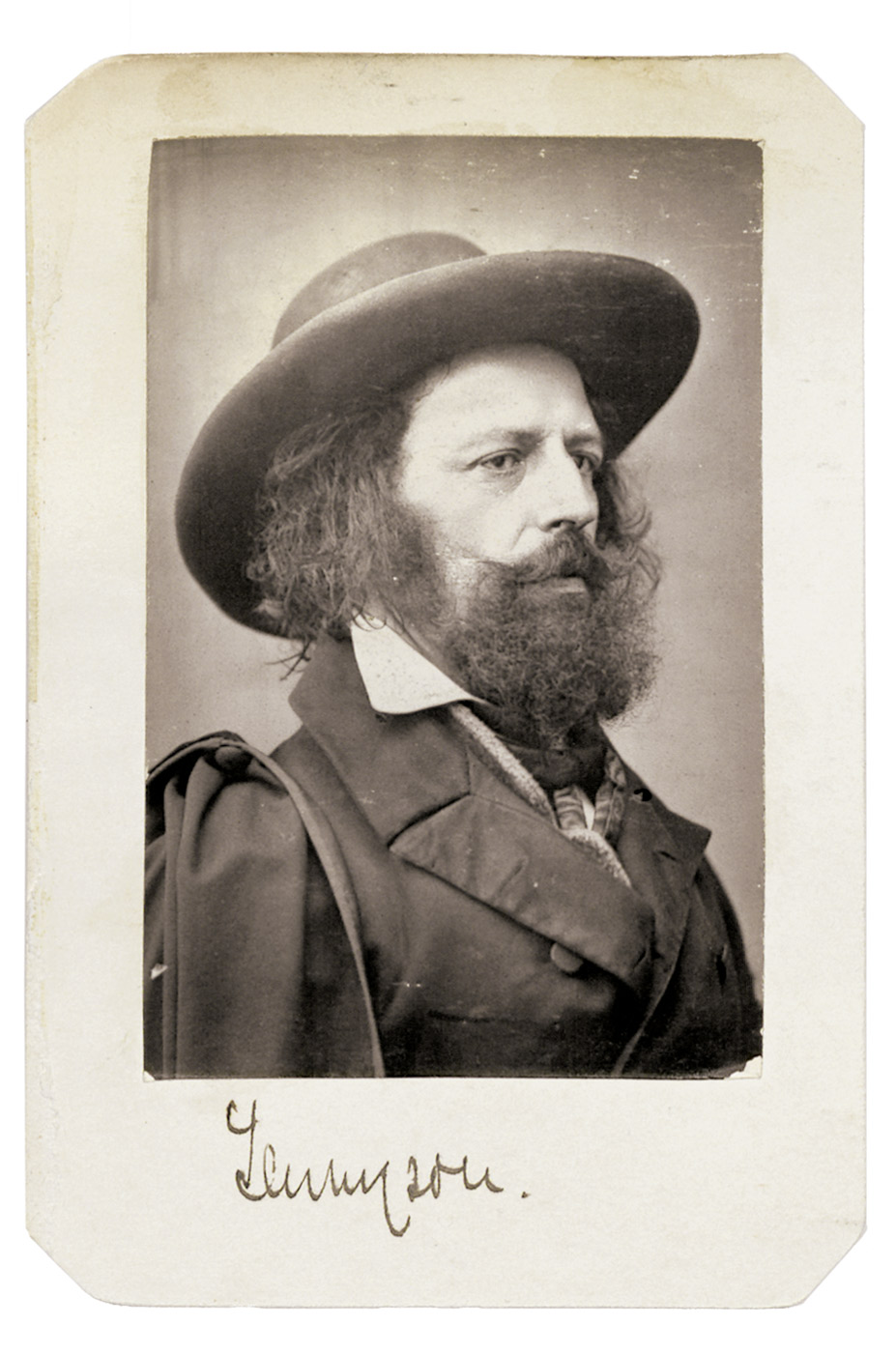
Alfred Lord Tennyson

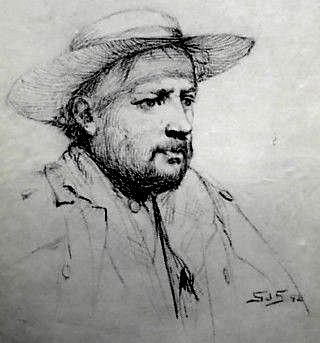
Bernard Walter Evans

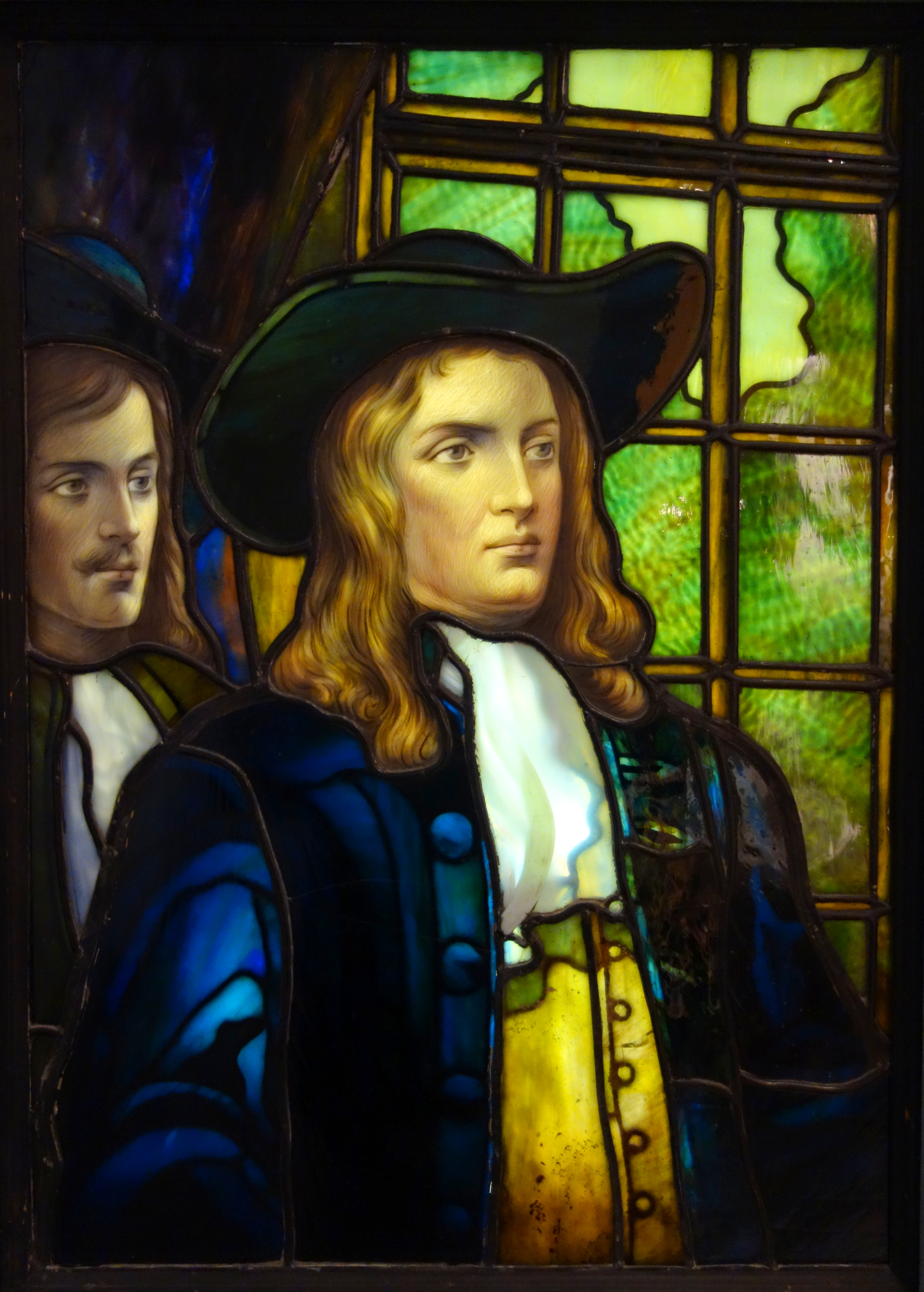
William Penn

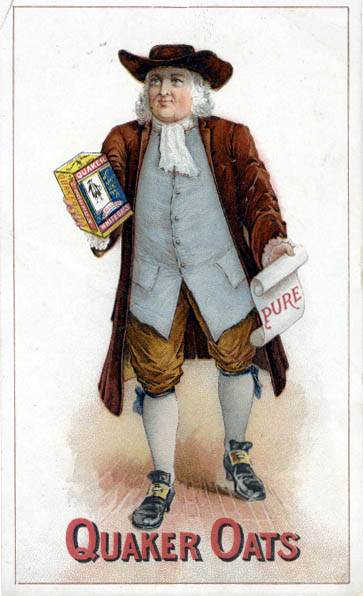
Quaker Oats Mascot

== See also ==
- List of hat styles
