= Boar Lane, Leeds (painting) =

Painting by John Atkinson Grimshaw

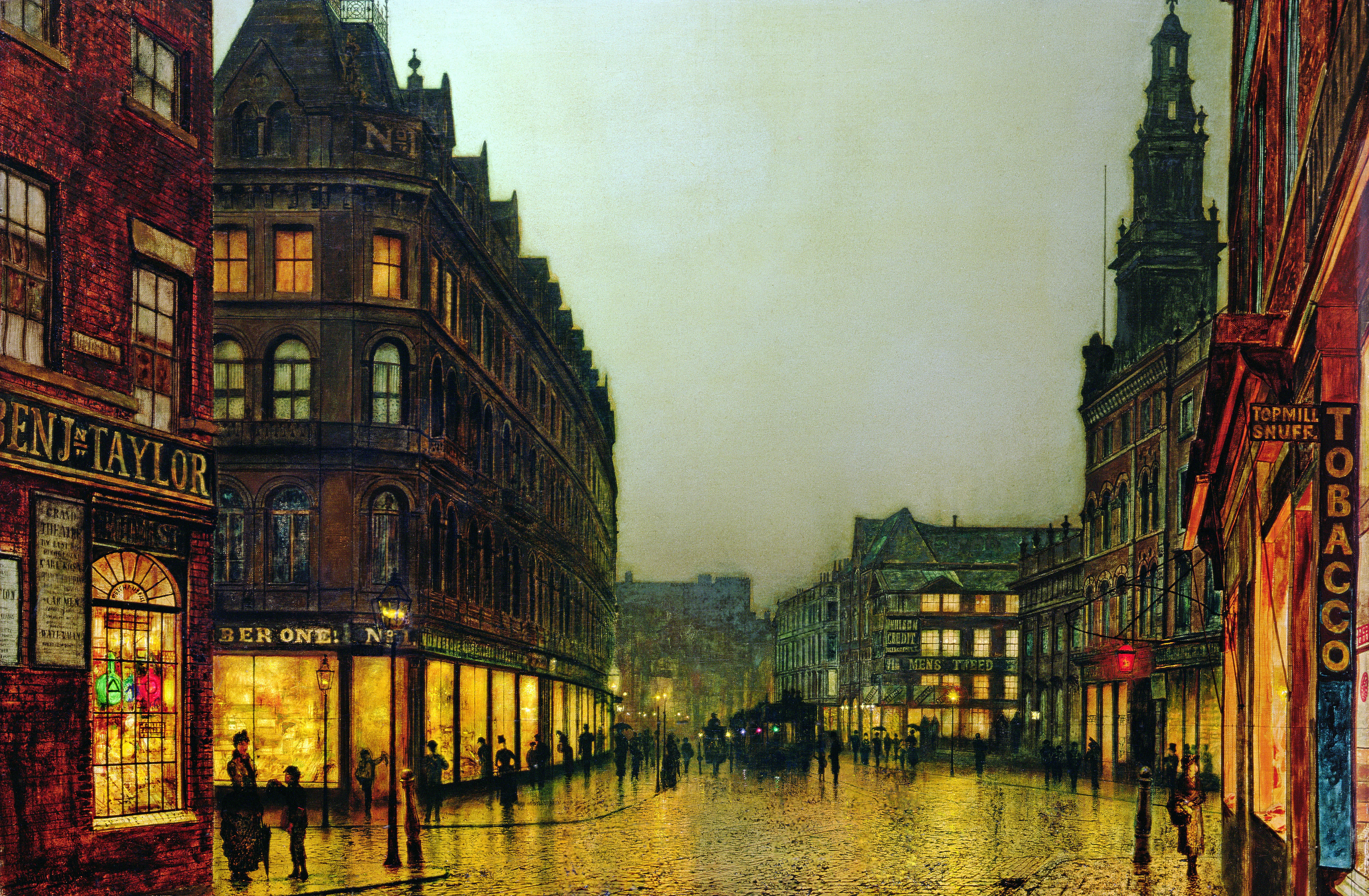
- Artist: John Atkinson Grimshaw
- Year: 1881
- Type: Oil on canvas, cityscape
- Dimensions: 61.2 cm × 91.6 cm (24.1 in × 36.1 in)
- Location: Leeds Art Gallery, Leeds

Boar Lane, Leeds is an oil on canvas painting by the English artist John Atkinson Grimshaw, from 1881. It is held at the Leeds Art Gallery.

== History and description ==
A cityscape, it depicts Boar Lane in the centre of the West Yorkshire city of Leeds. Grimshaw was well known for his depictions of streets in the evening. Boar Lane had undergone a major widening scheme in 1868 and featured many of the city's most fashionable shops catering to the Victorian middle classes. A major feature is the emphasis on the light-cascading out of the shops on the wet cobblestones. Several people are seen in the streets and also a carriage.

Several different versions of the painting exist, with the most prominent in the collection of Leeds Art Gallery.

Another version Boar Lane by Lamplight was auctioned by Christie's for £156,000 in 2017.

== Bibliography ==
- Hey, David. A History of Yorkshire. Carnegie Publishing, 2005.
- Robertson, Alexander. Atkinson Grimshaw. Phaidon Press, 1996.
