= Leeds Art Gallery =

Coordinates: 53.8001°N 1.5481°W

- Main entrance and frontage
- Established: 3 October 1888
- Location: The Headrow; Leeds, LS1 3AA
- Type: art gallery
- Key holdings: 20th-century British art
- Visitors: 453,088 (2013)
- Website: Leeds Art Gallery

Leeds Art Gallery in Leeds, West Yorkshire, England, is a gallery, part of the Leeds Museums & Galleries group, whose collection of 20th-century British Art was designated by the British government in 1997 as a collection "of national importance". Its collection also includes 19th-century and earlier art works. It is a grade II listed building owned and administered by Leeds City Council, linked on the West to Leeds Central Library and on the East via a bridge to the Henry Moore Institute with which it shares some sculptures. A Henry Moore sculpture, Reclining Woman: Elbow (1981), stands in front of the entrance. The entrance hall contains Leeds' oldest civic sculpture, a 1712 marble statue of Queen Anne.

In front of the gallery is Victoria Square, at the eastern end of which is the city's war memorial. This square is often used for rallies and demonstrations because of the speakers' dais provided by the raised entrance to the gallery.

== History ==
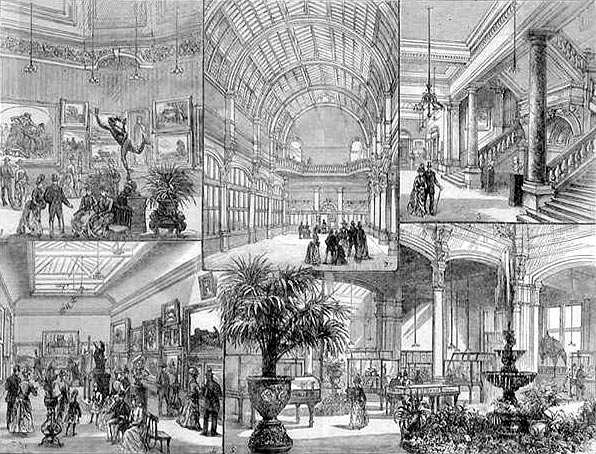
Opening of Leeds City Art Gallery in 1888 from the Illustrated London News

The original concept of this gallery was initiated by an executive committee formed in 1876 for the purpose, by Leeds Fine Art Society. The original committee included its president, the Marquis of Ripon, Hon. Sec. John Joseph Willson, Rev. John Gott (vicar of Leeds, and son of Benjamin Gott), John Atkinson Grimshaw, and architect William Henry Thorp (1852–1944). The gallery was built between 1886–88 by Thorp, as an extension to the Municipal Buildings to the west (built 1878–84 by George Corson, now housing Leeds Central Library). It opened on 3 October 1888 as Leeds City Art Gallery and was paid for by public subscription, collected in honour of Queen Victoria's Golden Jubilee in 1887. It was opened by the Mayor, Alderman Archibald Witham Scarr (1827–1904), with the artist Hubert von Herkomer in attendance. What is now the Tiled Hall Café was the sculpture gallery, having been modified from the Reading Room of the adjacent public library, to be illuminated by electricity. All other galleries were lit by daylight from rooflights. The new building had a central court of two storeys with a glass roof and a fountain of Burmatofts faience. (A floor was later put in to create additional space.)

In 1912, the Leeds Art Collections Fund (now known as the Leeds Art Fund) was formed to support the gallery's acquisitions. At its centenary exhibition in 2012, it displayed the 430 works it had helped to acquire for the city.

In 1982 it was modified, turning the entrance from the East side to the South, on the Headrow, with an extension for the sculpture collection. A further development was the conversion of three Victorian houses on Cookridge street to the Henry Moore Institute, which is now linked by a bridge to the gallery and contains the main sculpture collections. The new building was opened by Queen Elizabeth II on 26 November 1982.

A £1.5 million renovation was completed in June 2007, including opening up the magnificent Victorian Tiled Hall (used as a café and bookshop) which links the gallery and the library, and the former Queen's Gallery was named after local businessman and patron of the arts, Arnold Ziff. At first floor level there is direct access from the gallery to the Art Library. The gallery includes a ground floor lecture theatre named after Henry Moore which is used for a variety of events.

It closed again in January 2016 for extensive renovation, re-opening 13 October 2017. The renovation uncovered the glass roof in the Central Court Gallery, which had been covered by a false ceiling. An abstract wall painting by Lothar Götz was provided to brighten up the Victorian staircase.

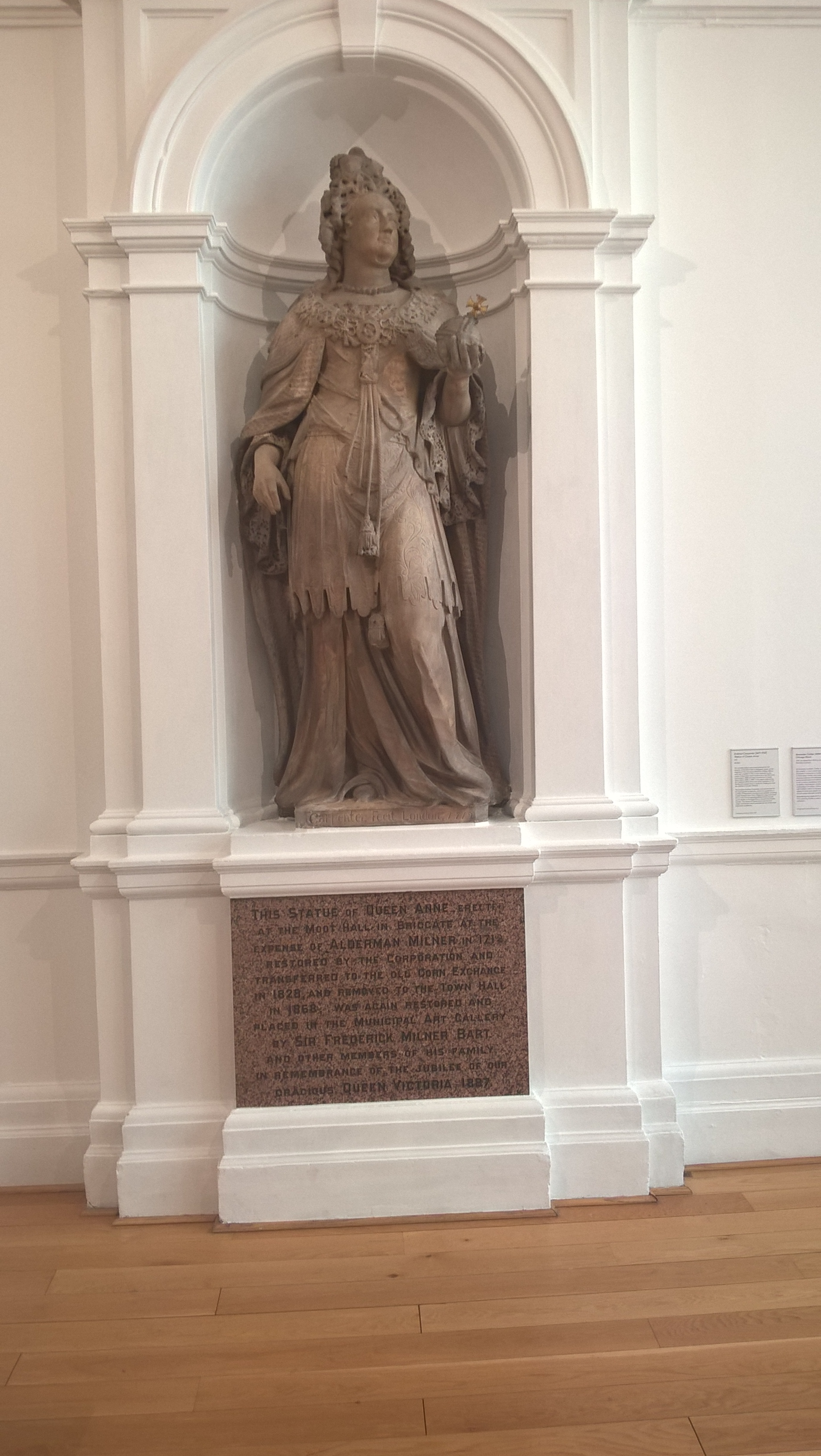
1712 statue of Queen Anne

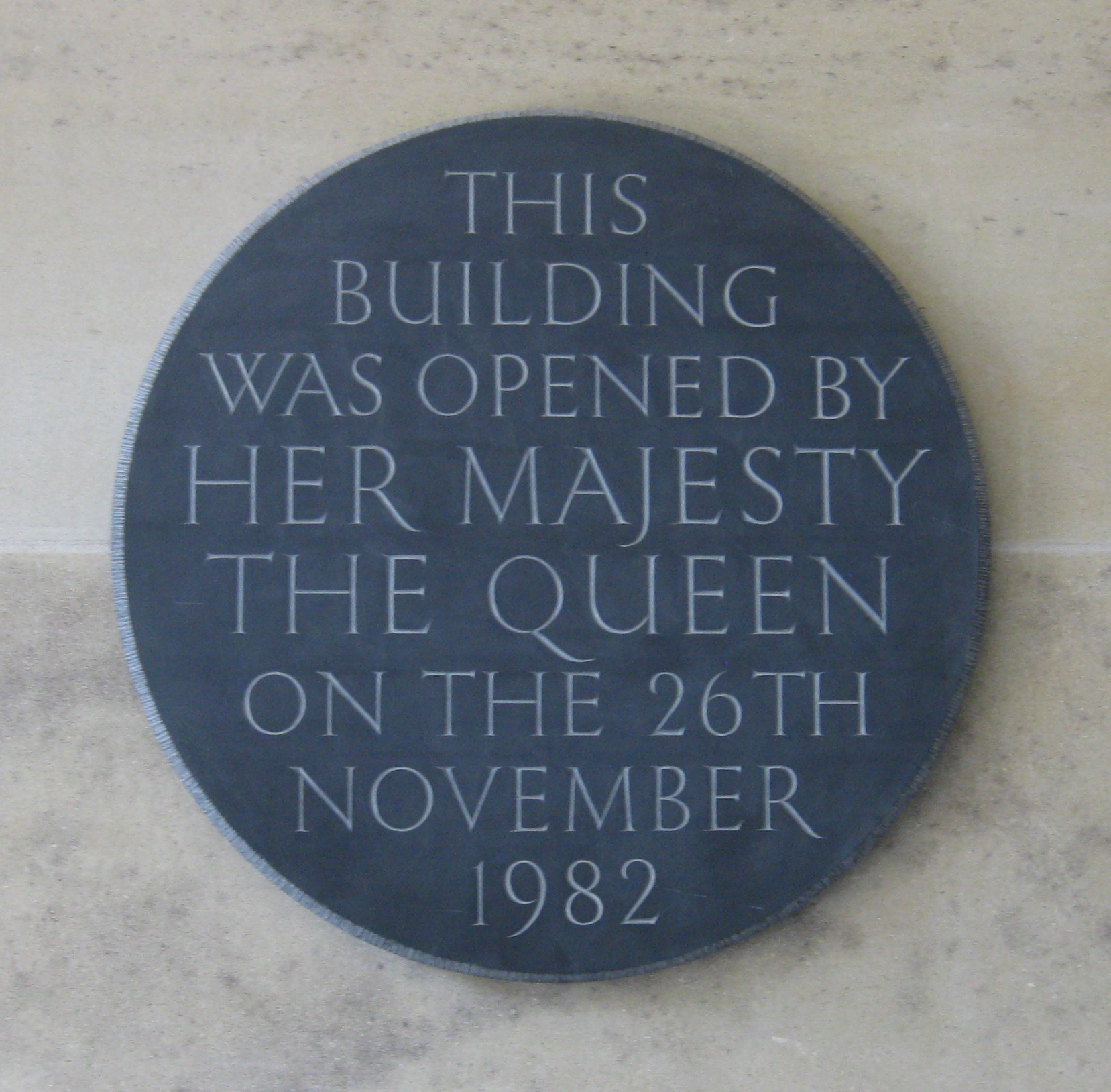
1982 commemorative plaque

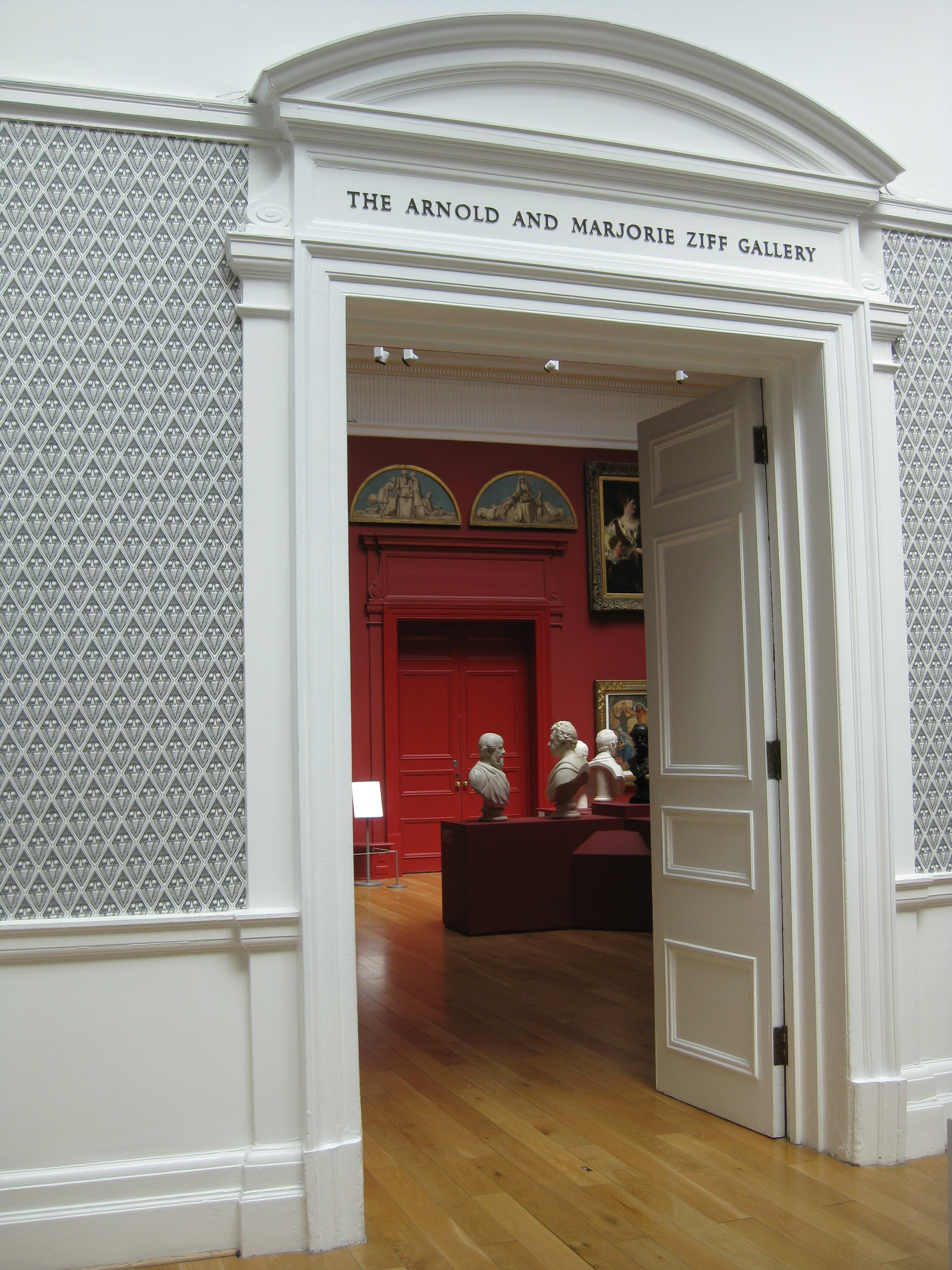
Ziff Gallery (formerly the Queen's Room)

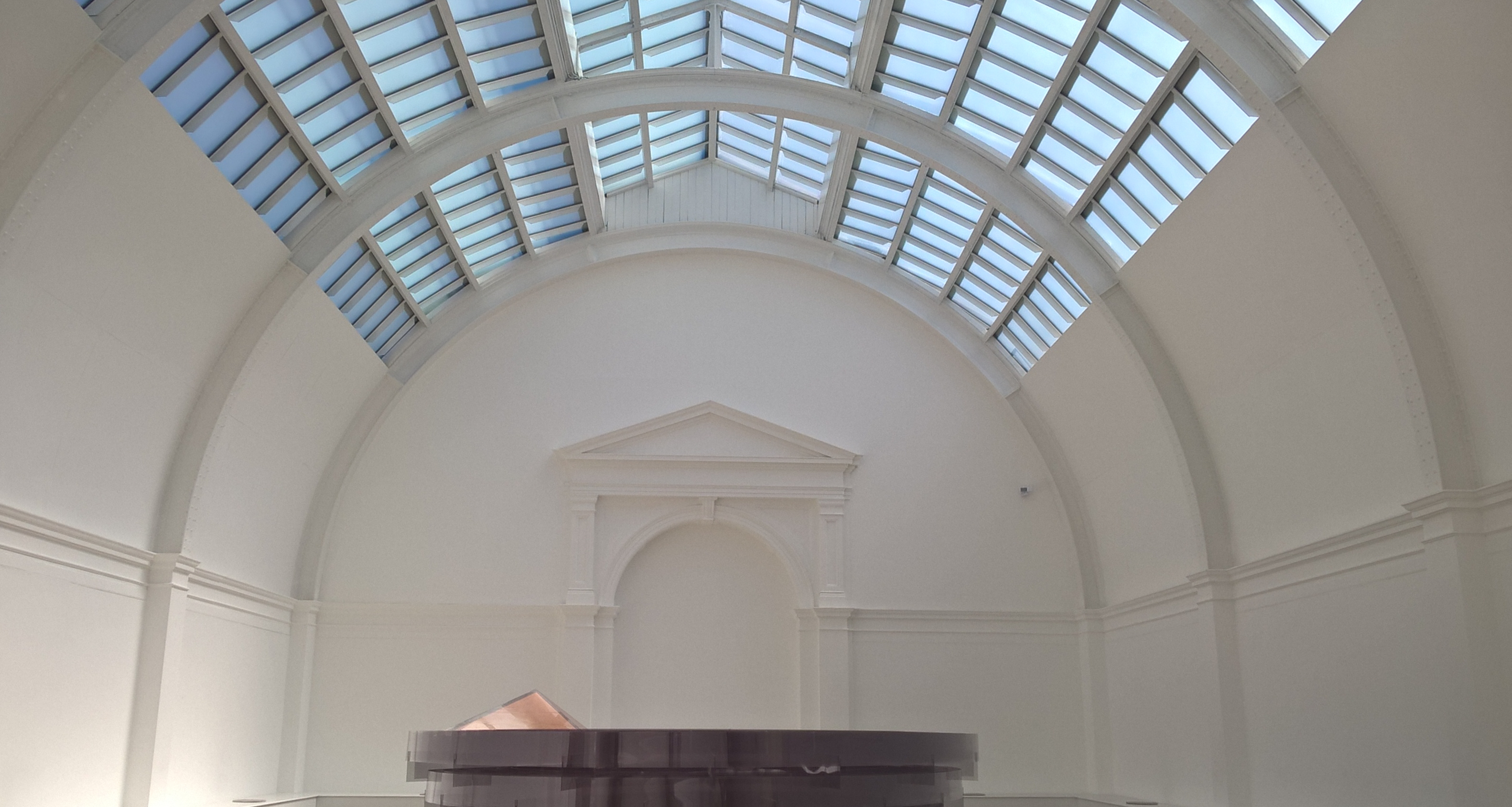
The glass roof uncovered in 2016

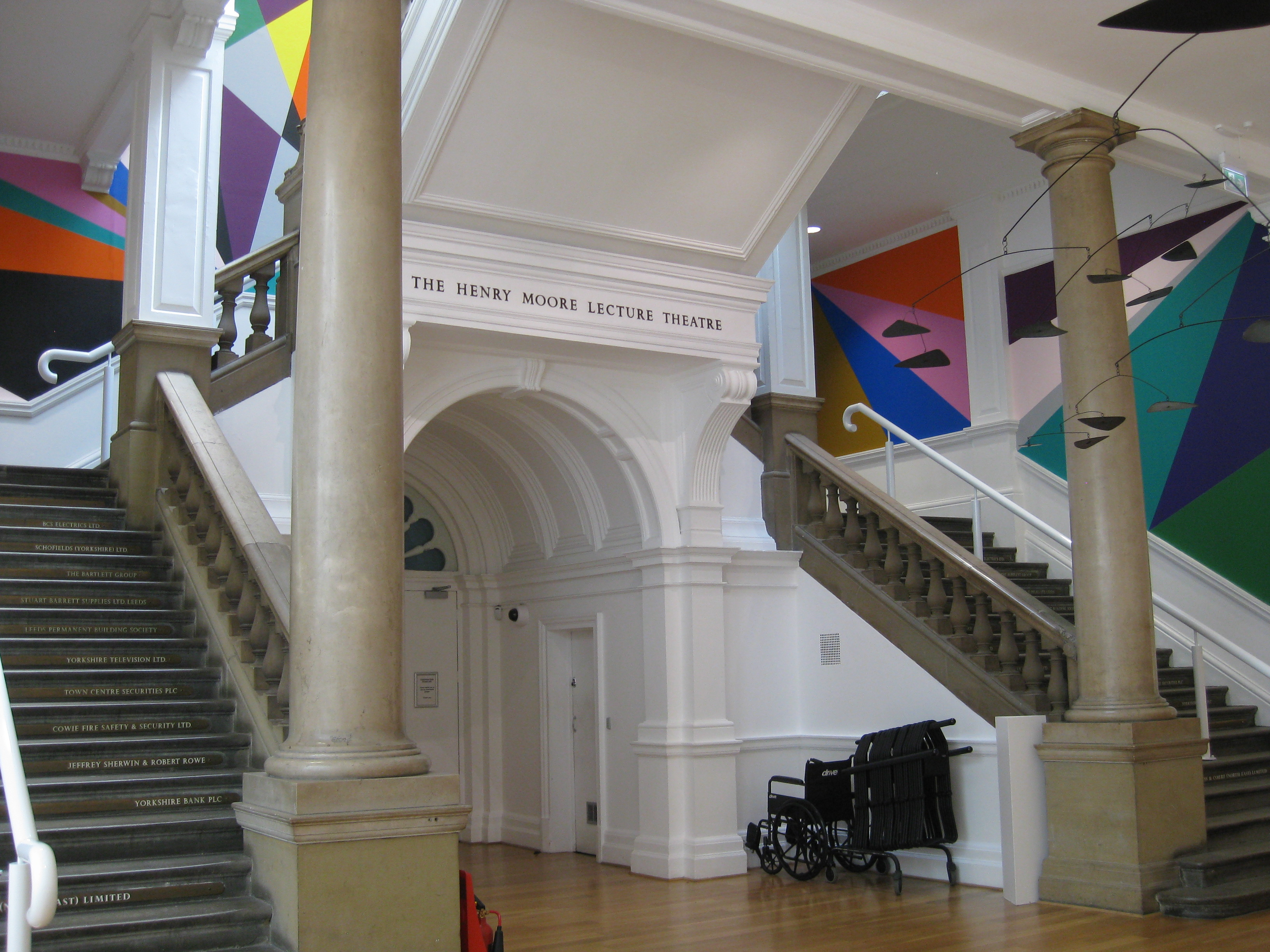
Main staircase and lecture theatre

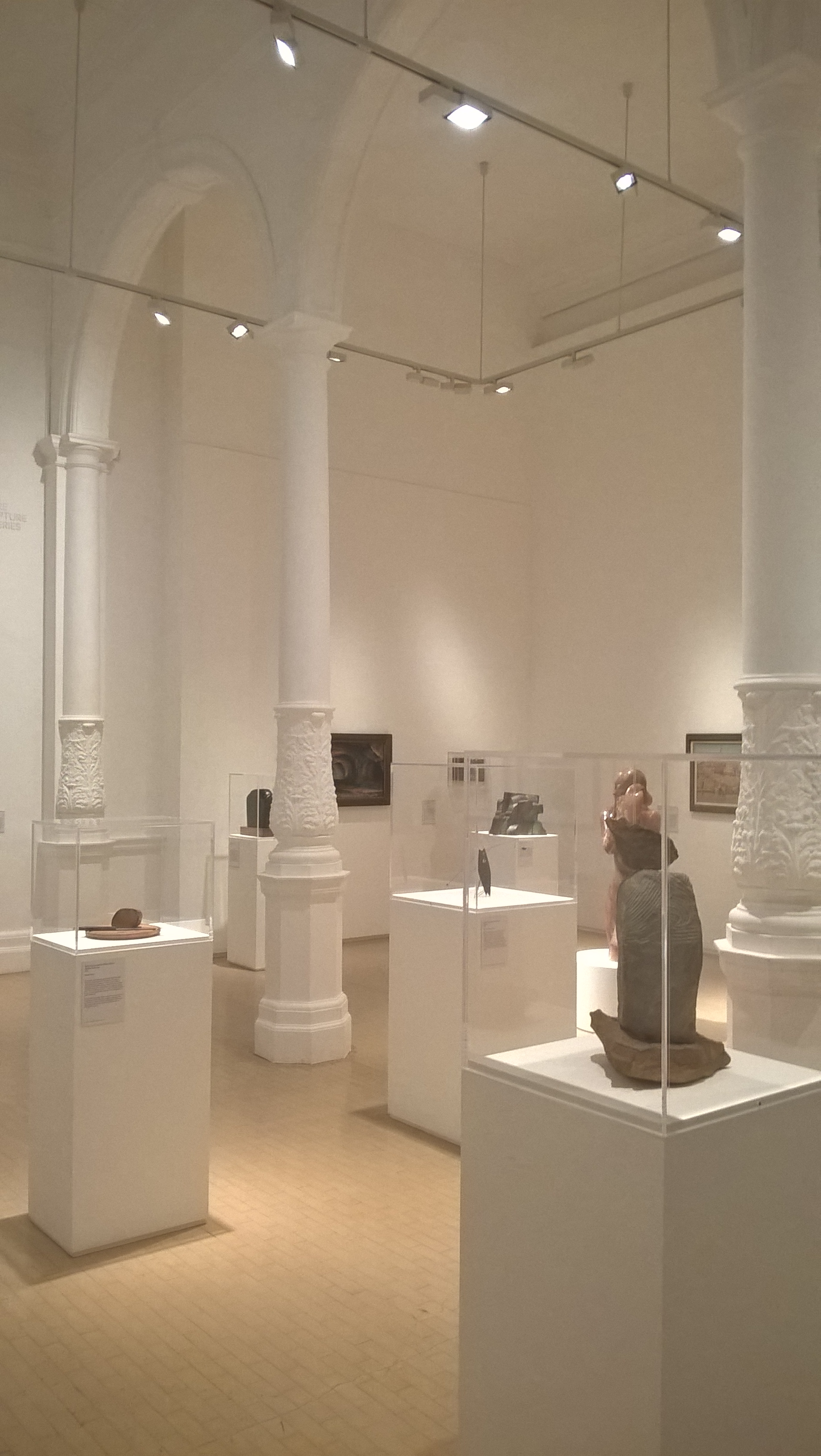
Ground floor sculpture gallery

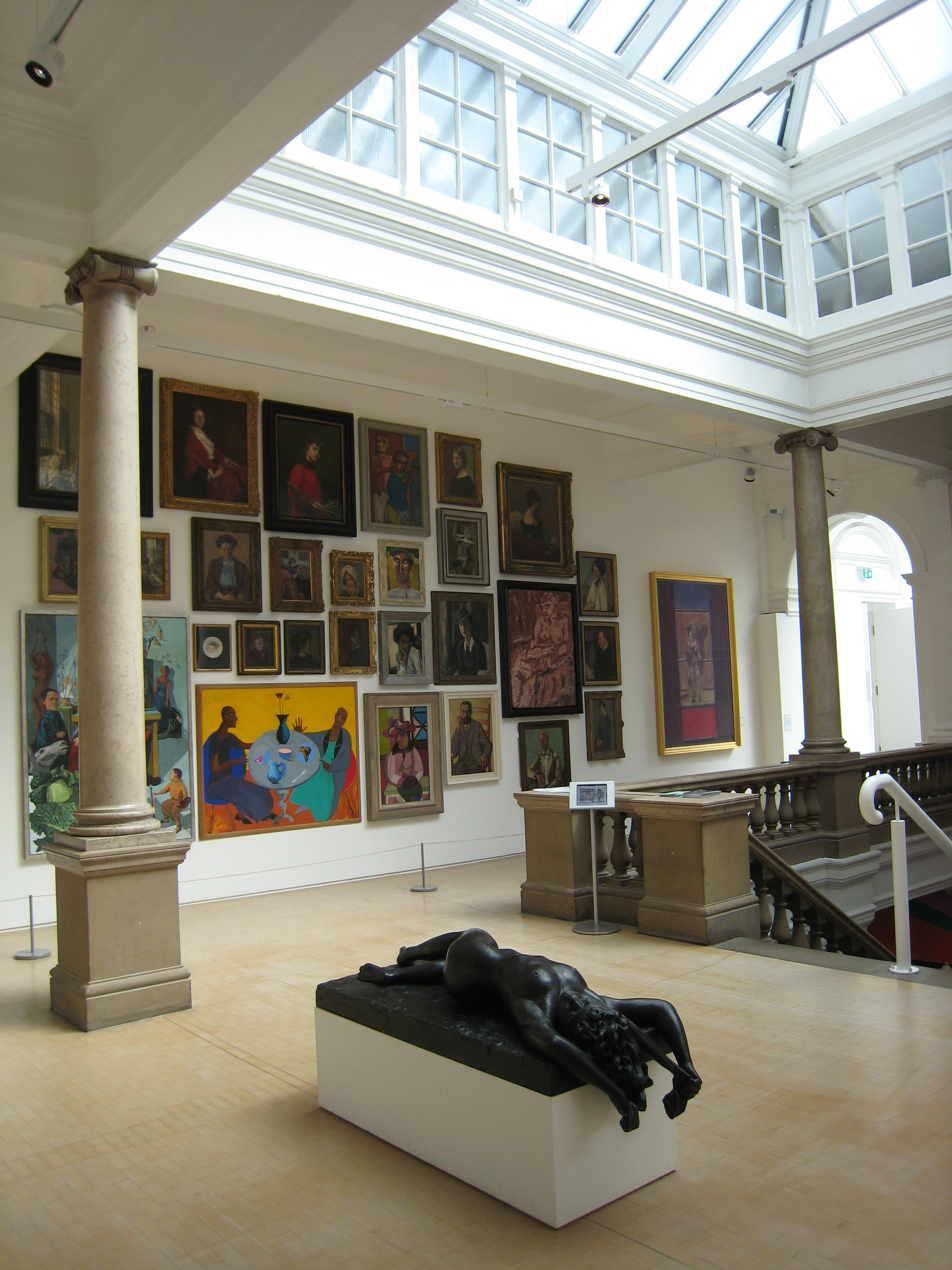
First floor landing and exhibition area

== On display ==
=== "Ten key works" ===
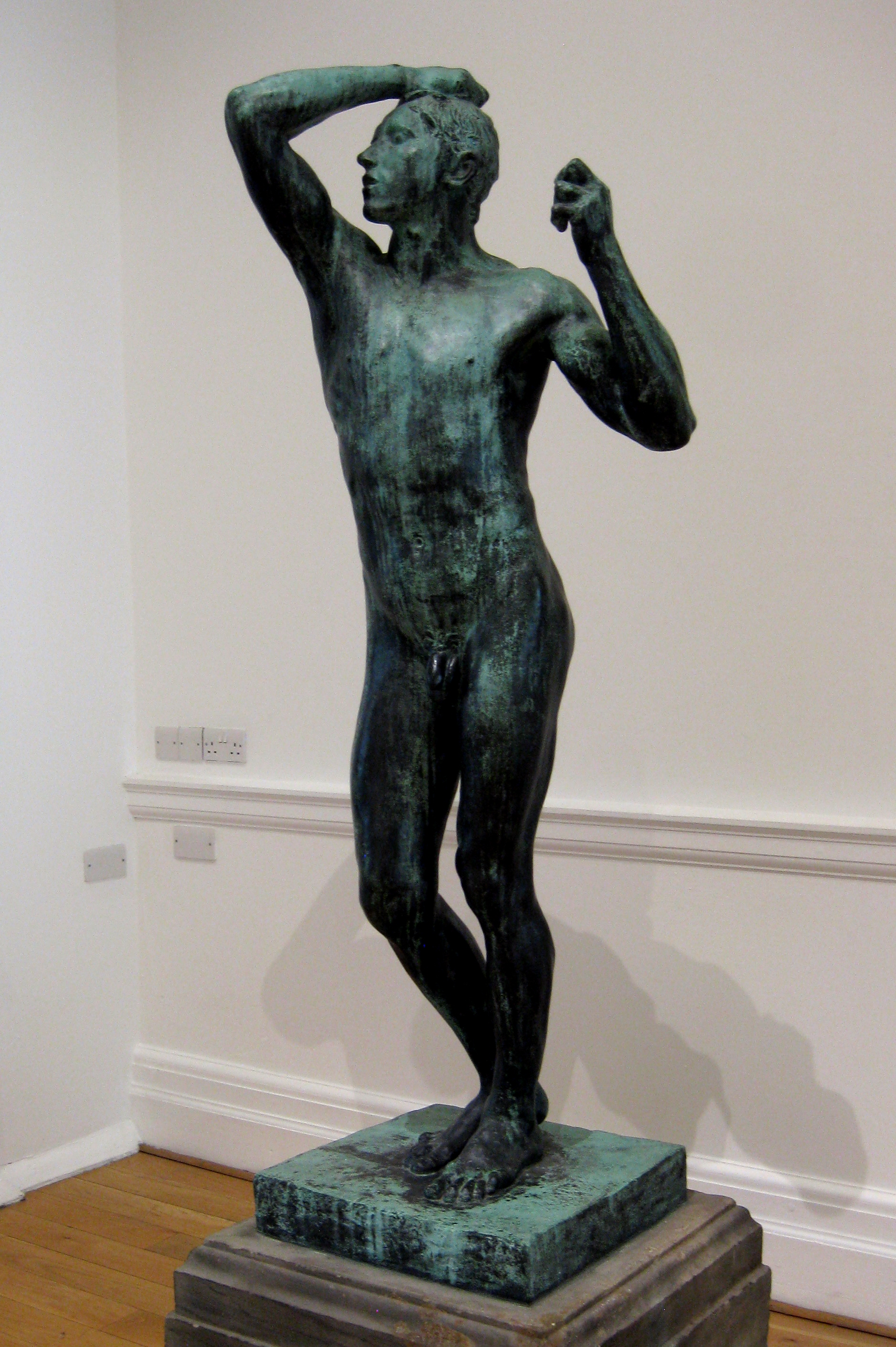
The Age of Bronze, by Rodin

The gallery's visitor leaflet suggesting "Ten key works" for a short visit lists the following items (listed here in date order):

- Retribution, Edward Armitage, 1858
- The Age of Bronze, Auguste Rodin, 1877 (cast 1906)
- The Valley of Shadows, Evelyn De Morgan, 1899
- Maternity, Jacob Epstein, 1910
- Praxitella, Wyndham Lewis, 1921
- Reclining Figure, Henry Moore, 1929
- Painting, Francis Bacon, 1950
- Postcard Flag (Union Jack), Tony Cragg, 1981
- Maquette for Brick Man, Antony Gormley, 1986
- The Artist in her Studio, Paula Rego, 1993

=== Other ===
Other works on display in the galleries include :

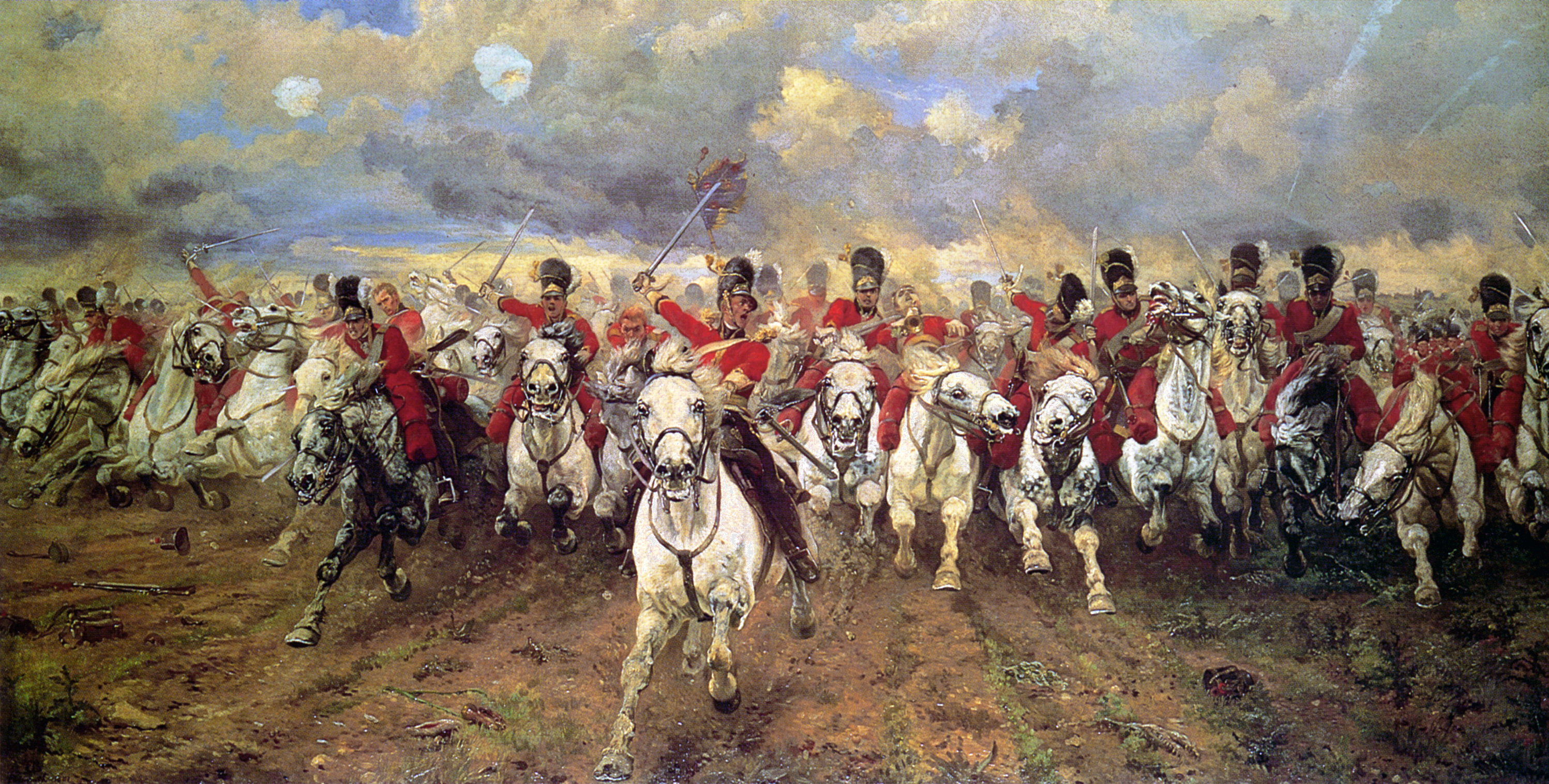
Scotland Forever! (1881) Elizabeth Thompson

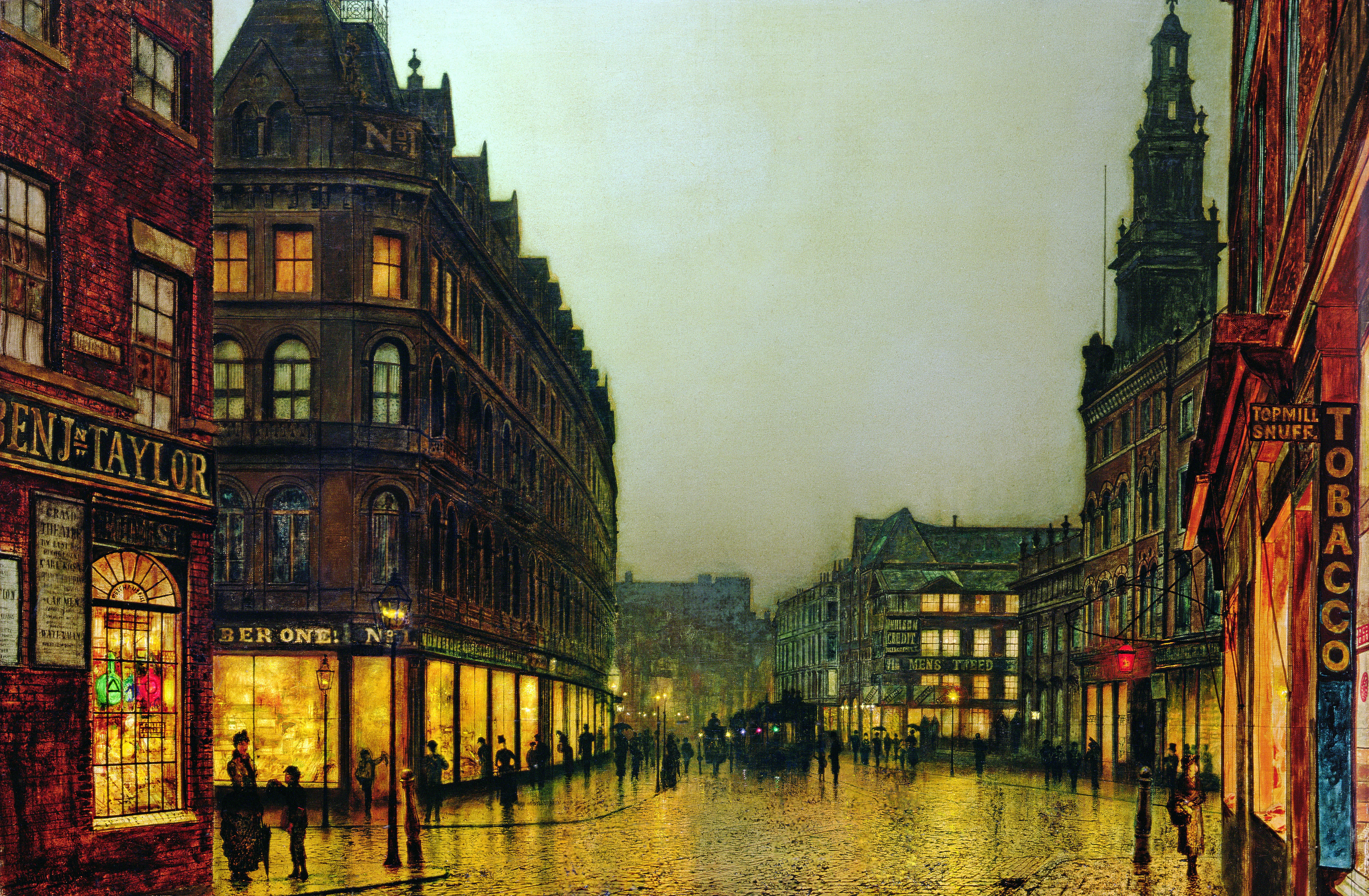
Boar Lane, Leeds (1881) Atkinson Grimshaw

- Paintings
  - The Shadow of Death (1870–73), William Holman Hunt
  - Boar Lane, Leeds (1881), Atkinson Grimshaw
  - Scotland Forever! (1881), Elizabeth Thompson
  - The Bridesmaid (1883–85), James Tissot
  - The Lady of Shalott Looking at Lancelot (c.1894), John William Waterhouse
  - The Tin Mine (1942), Graham Sutherland
- Sculpture
  - Hieroglyph - Barbara Hepworth
  - Mother and Child - Henry Moore

== See also ==
- Listed buildings in Leeds (City and Hunslet Ward - northern area)
