= Frederick Henry Henshaw =

English painter (1807–1891)

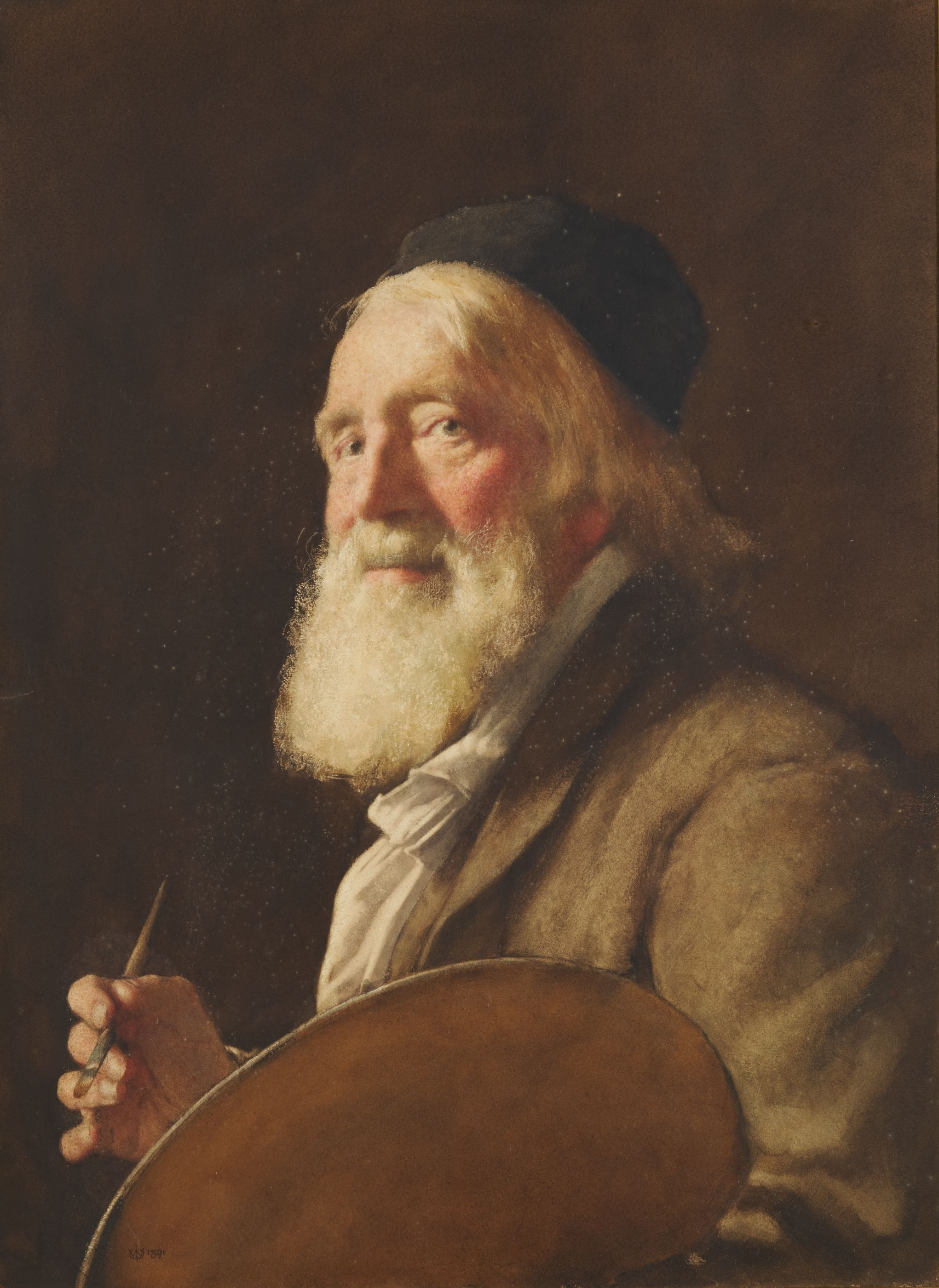
Portrait of Frederick Henry Henshaw by William John Wainwright, 1891.

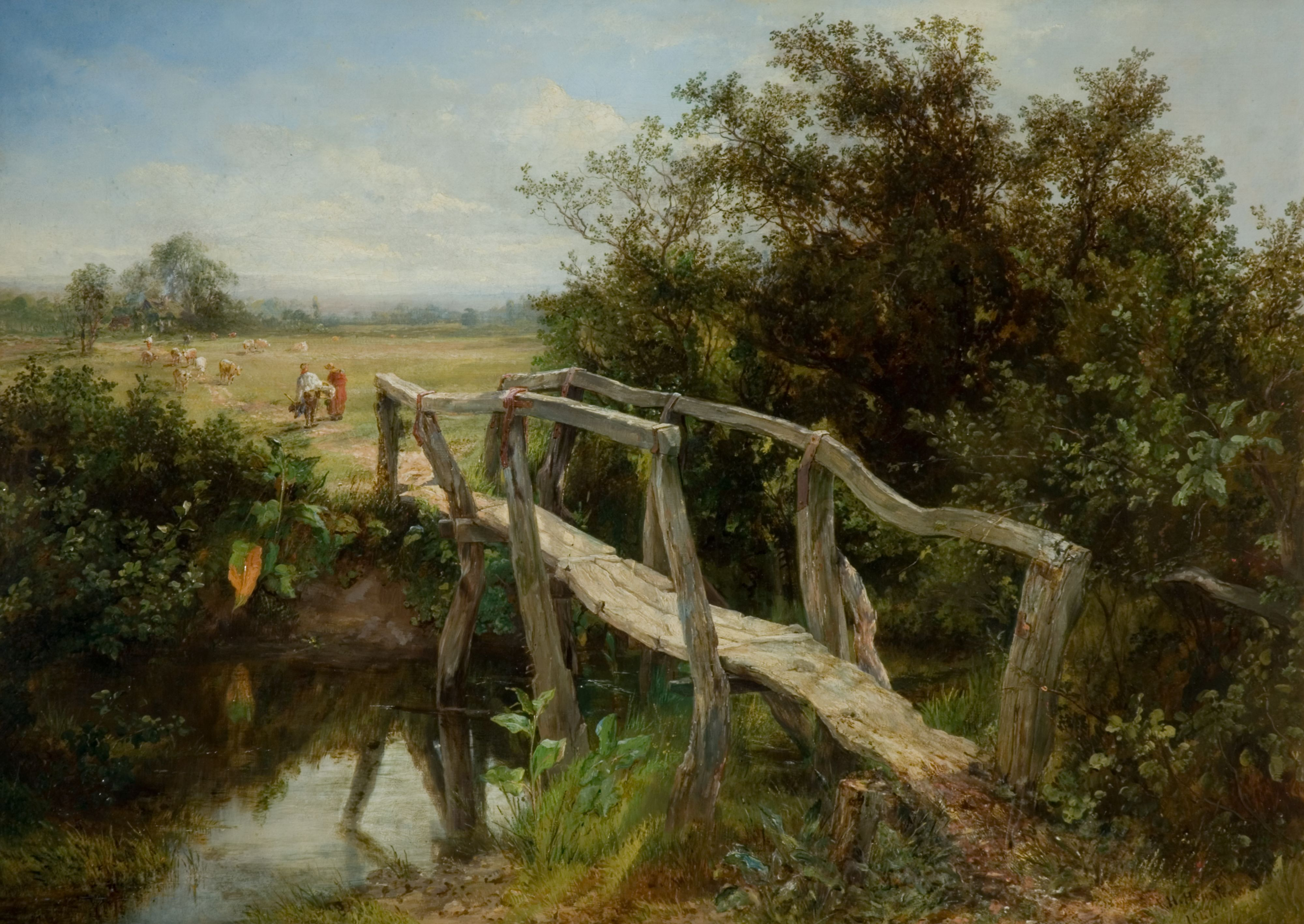
The Old Footbridge Over The River Cole at Yardley by Frederick Henry Henshaw, 1830–1890.

Frederick Henry Henshaw (1807–1891) was an artist who produced landscapes, architectural subjects, portraits and figures. He was a pupil of artist Joseph Vincent Barber (1788–1838). Henshaw found inspiration in the country-side paintings of Constable and he often painted English woodland, which was being taken over by the development of industry and modern farming. In order to find subjects for his brush and pencil work, Henshaw travelled in the United Kingdom and Europe, touring Italy in 1838.

Henshaw was a member of the Birmingham Society of Arts (now known as the Royal Birmingham Society of Artists), joining at the age of nineteen in 1826. Furthermore, he became honorary secretary of the society from 1842 to 1847 and went on to be honorary treasurer and a trustee until the end of his life in 1891.

Henshaw was the youngest brother of three. The oldest, John, was a skillful diesinker and medallist and the other brother, Thomas, was an engraver.

From 1829 to 1864 Henshaw was a constant exhibitor at the Royal Academy. He was born and lived in Harborne, before moving to the Birmingham suburb of Small Heath from 1840 until his death. He occasionally collaborated with fellow Birmingham landscape artist Robert John Hammond.
