= 1968 in art =

Events from the year 1968 in art.

== Events ==
- March 5 – Musical chess match between Marcel Duchamp and John Cage takes place at Ryerson Polytechnic, Toronto.
- May 2 – Christ Church Picture Gallery in Oxford, England, designed by Powell and Moya, is opened.
- June 3 – Radical feminist Valerie Solanas shoots Andy Warhol at his New York City studio, The Factory; he survives after a 5-hour operation.
- July 17 – Release of the animated musical fantasy film Yellow Submarine in the United Kingdom, directed by George Dunning with art direction by Heinz Edelmann
- August 20 – The National Gallery of Victoria in Melbourne, Australia, designed by Sir Roy Grounds, is opened.
- September 15 – The Neue Nationalgalerie in West Berlin, Germany, designed by Mies van der Rohe, is opened.
- November 7 – New building for the São Paulo Museum of Art (MASP) in Brazil, designed by Lina Bo Bardi, is inaugurated.
- Rubens' The Adoration of the Magi (1634) is installed as an altarpiece at King's College Chapel, Cambridge.

== Awards ==
- Archibald Prize: William Edwin Pidgeon – Lloyd Rees
- Elaine Hamilton wins first prize at the Biennale de Menton, France

== Exhibitions ==
- Cybernetic Serendipity - August 2 until October 20 at the Institute of Contemporary Arts in London, United Kingdom then traveled to the United States
- Eva Hesse – Chain Polymers, Fischbach Gallery, W. 57th Street, New York City
- Ralph Hotere – Black Paintings, Auckland, New Zealand

== Works ==
- William Anders – Earthrise (photograph)
- Edward Bawden – Tottenham Hale and Highbury & Islington tile motifs on London Underground's Victoria line
- Julia Black – Walthamstow Central tile motif on London Underground's Victoria line
- Alexander Calder – Gwenfritz (stabile)
- Donald De Lue – The Special Warfare Memorial Statue
- Paul Delvaux – The Sacrifice of Iphigenia
- Mark di Suvero – Snowplow (sculpture)
- Joseph Drapell – Life (sculpture, Halifax, Nova Scotia)
- Tom Eckersley – Finsbury Park, King's Cross St Pancras and Euston tile motifs on London Underground's Victoria line
- M. C. Escher – Metamorphosis III (colored woodcut print)
- Alan Fletcher – Warren Street tile motif on London Underground's Victoria line
- Ángela Gurría - Señal in Mexico City, Mexico created for the occasion of the 1968 Summer Olympics
- Barbara Hepworth – Two Figures (sculpture), Three Obliques (Walk In) (sculpture)
- David Hockney - Christopher Isherwood and Don Bachardy
  - Marilyn Tapestry
- Dani Karavan – Monument to the Negev Brigade on hill overlooking Beersheba, Israel (completed)
- Eduardo Kingman – Fin de Mascarada
- Julio Le Parc - Celule Avec Luminere un Vibration
- Joan Miró – begins series The navigator's hope
- Henry Moore – Three-Piece No. 3: Vertebrae (Working Model)
- Robert Motherwell – Open #23 (loaned by Graham Gund to Museum of Fine Arts, Boston)
- Otto Muehl, Günter Brus and other followers of Viennese Actionism – Kunst und Revolution (performance art)
- Isamu Noguchi – Octetra (concrete sculpture)
- Gerhard Richter – Domplatz, Mailand ("Cathedral Square, Milan")
- Monica Sjöö – God Giving Birth
- Kenneth Snelson – Needle Tower
- Hans Unger – Blackhorse Road and Seven Sisters tile motifs on London Underground's Victoria line
- David Wynne – River God Tyne and Swans in Flight (sculptures, Newcastle Civic Centre)
- Pangborn-Herndon Memorial Site (memorial column)

== Births ==
- May 21 – Hans-Ulrich Obrist, Swiss-born curator
- June 3 – Eric White, American visual artist
- July 6 – Gaspare Manos, Thai-Italian painter and sculptor
- July 11 – Patrik Andiné, Swedish painter
- July 23 – Paulo Henrique, Portuguese choreographer and multidisciplinary artist
- August 16 – Wolfgang Tillmans, German fine-art photographer
- September 17 – David Shrigley, British visual artist
- December 13 – Michael Triegel, German painter
- December 23 – Manuel Rivera-Ortiz, Puerto Rican documentary photographer
- date unknown
  - Sika Foyer, Togolese American artist
  - Juan Carlos Pinto - Guatemalan-born U.S. mosaic artist
  - Nahem Shoa, British portrait painter

== Deaths ==
- January 29 – Tsuguharu Foujita, Japanese-born French painter and printmaker (born 1886)
- February 11 – Jacob Steinhardt, German-born Jewish painter and woodcut artist (born 1887)
- April 26 – John Heartfield, German graphic designer (born 1891)
- May 9 – Harold Gray, American cartoonist, created Little Orphan Annie (born 1894)
- May 21 – Bror Hjorth, Swedish sculptor (born 1894)
- May 28 – Kees van Dongen, Dutch Fauvist painter (born 1877)
- June 17 – Cassandre, French graphic designer (born 1901)
- July 2 – Sir Hans Heysen, German-born Australian watercolour painter (born 1877)
- July 16 – William John Leech, Irish painter (born 1881)
- August 8 – Orovida Pissarro, English painter and etcher (born 1893)
- October 2 – Marcel Duchamp, influential French artist (born 1887)
- November – Lee Gatch, American painter and mixed-media artist (born 1902)
- November 2 – Estella Solomons, Irish painter (born 1882)
- November 4 – Michel Kikoine, Litvak-born French painter (born 1892)
- November 11 – Janet Sobel, Ukrainian American Abstract Expressionist pioneer of drip painting (born 1893)
- December 2 – Adamson-Eric, Estonian artist (born 1902)
- date unknown – William Conor, Irish painter (born 1881)

== See also ==
- 1968 in Fine Arts of the Soviet Union
