= 1881 in art =

Events from the year 1881 in art.

== Events ==
- April – Sixth Impressionist exhibition in Paris, at Nadar's studio.
- May 2 – The Royal Academy Exhibition of 1881 opens at Burlington House in London
- August 31 – English painters Thomas Cooper Gotch and Caroline Burland Yates marry at Newlyn.
- The Société des Artistes Français is established, with William-Adolphe Bouguereau as its first president.
- Vincent van Gogh returns from study in Brussels to his parents' home in Etten (Netherlands) where he produces a number of early works, including the start of his series of peasant character studies and still lifes (including Still Life with Straw Hat).

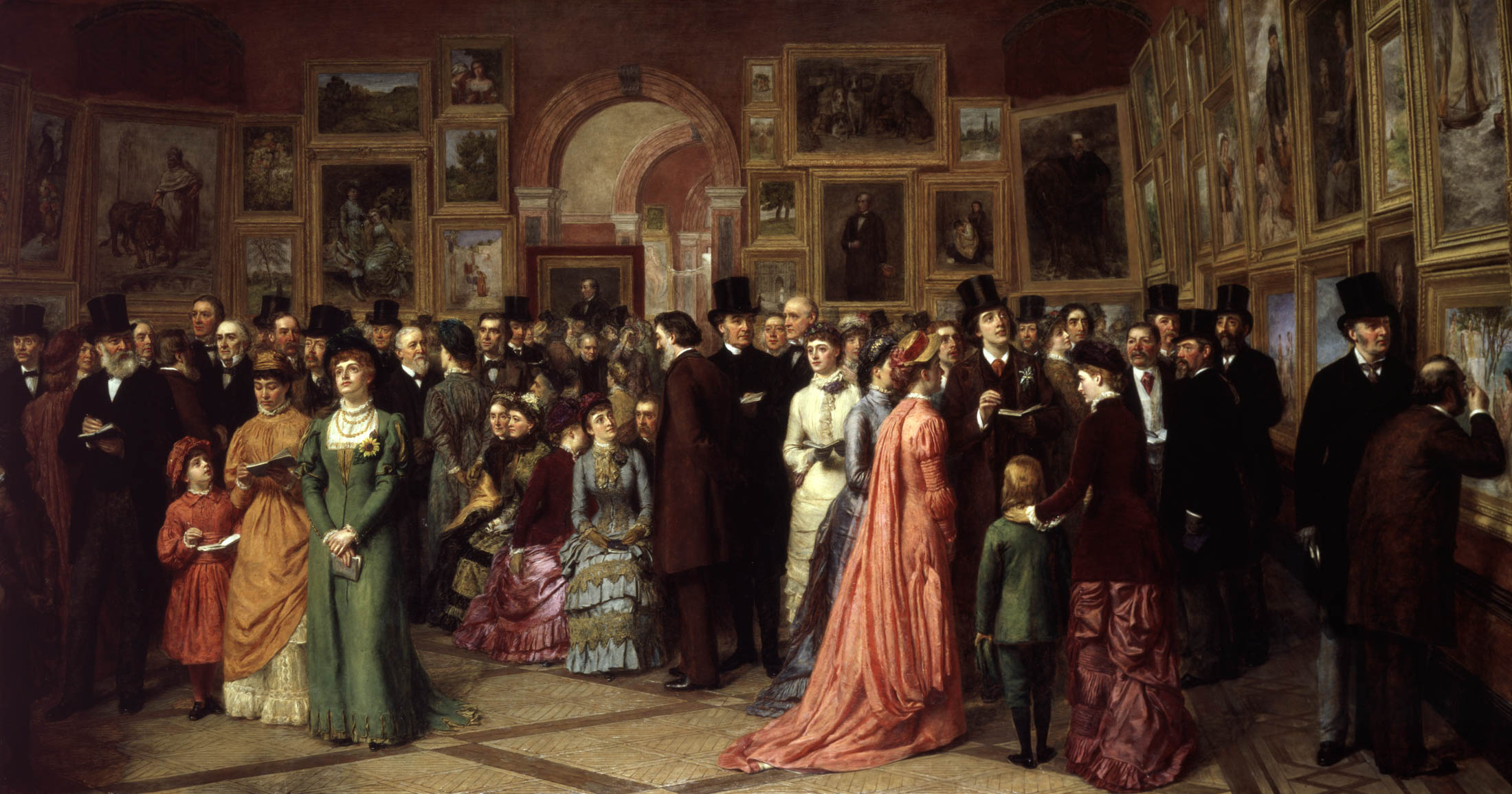
William Powell Frith – A Private View at the Royal Academy, 1881 (1883)

- Art Gallery of South Australia established in Adelaide.
- St. Louis School and Museum of Fine Arts established at Washington University in St. Louis, Missouri, under the direction of Halsey Ives.
- Dante Gabriel Rossetti's Ballads and Sonnets published.
- The Vermeer painting which becomes known as Girl with a Pearl Earring emerges from obscurity (in poor comdition) at an auction in The Hague where, on the advice of art historian Victor de Stuers (who is anxious to prevent expatriation of Dutch art), it is purchased by collector Arnoldus Andries des Tombe for only two guilders (plus thirty cents buyer's premium) (equivalent to roughly €24 in 2015).

== Works ==
- Lawrence Alma-Tadema
  - The Tepidarium
  - Sappho and Alcaeus
- Marie Bashkirtseff – The Studio
- Jules Bastien-Lepage – Pauvre Fauvette
- Alfred Boucher – La Piété Filiale (sculpture)
- Frank Bramley – A Hopeless Dawn
- Lady Butler – Scotland Forever!
- Gustave Caillebotte – The Bezique Game (La partie de Bésigue)
- Paul Cézanne – Self-portrait with olive wallpaper
- Pierre Puvis de Chavannes – The Poor Fisherman (Musée d'Orsay, Paris)
- John Collier
  - Charles Darwin
  - Sir George Jessel
- Edgar Degas
  - Little Dancer of Fourteen Years (sculpture)
  - Trotting Horse, the feet not touching the ground (sculpture, California Palace of the Legion of Honor, San Francisco)
- Stanhope Forbes – A Street in Brittany
- Aleksander Gierymski – Jewess with Oranges
- Atkinson Grimshaw
  - Boar Lane, Leeds
  - Shipping on the Clyde
- Ralph Hedley – John Graham Lough in His Studio
- Jean-Jacques Henner – Saint Jerome
- Max Klinger – Paraphrases about the Finding of a Glove (etchings, printed)
- Peder Severin Krøyer – Messalina
- Benjamin Williams Leader – February Fill Dyke
- Frederic Leighton
  - Bianca
  - Whispers
- Juan Luna – The Death of Cleopatra
- Édouard Manet
  - Dead Eagle Owl
  - Le Suicidé
- Luc-Olivier Merson – Nôtre-Dame de Paris
- Hendrik Willem Mesdag – Panorama Mesdag
- John Everett Millais
  - Portrait of Benjamin Disraeli
  - Portrait of Alfred Tennyson
- Claude Monet – Waves Breaking
- Albert Joseph Moore
  - Blossoms
  - Yellow Marguerites
- Hjalmar Munsterhjelm – Woodland Pool by Moonlight
- Giovanni Muzzioli – In the Temple of Bacchus
- Jean-François Raffaëlli – Les déclassés (The Absinthe Drinkers)
- Vinnie Ream – Admiral David G. Farragut (bronze, Washington, D.C.)

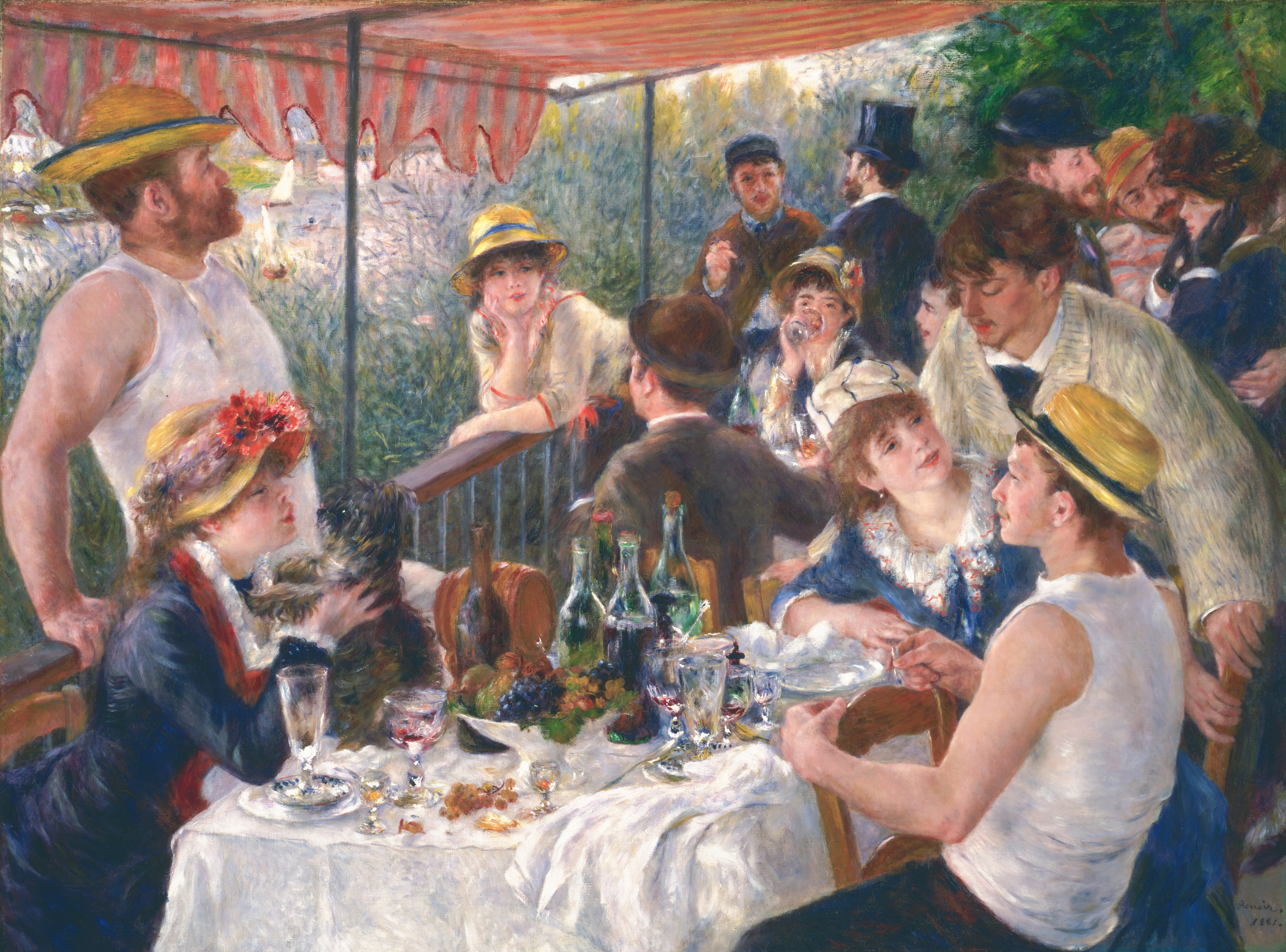
Renoir - Luncheon of the Boating Party

- Pierre-Auguste Renoir
  - Bay of Naples, Evening (Clark Art Institute, Williamstown, Massachusetts)
  - Blonde Bather (first version)
  - Luncheon of the Boating Party
  - Two Sisters (On the Terrace)
  - Pink and Blue
- Ilya Repin
  - Polina Strepetova as Lizaveta
  - Portrait of the composer Modest Petrovich Mussorgsky
- Dante Gabriel Rossetti – Found (work finished but never completed)
- Augustus Saint-Gaudens – Admiral David Glasgow Farragut (bronze, Manhattan)
- John Singer Sargent – Dr. Samuel Jean Pozzi at Home
- Henryk Siemiradzki – The Sword Dance
- William Stott of Oldham – Le Passeur ("The Ferry", Tate Britain)
- Henry Jones Thaddeus – La retour du bracconier (The Wounded Poacher)
- James Tissot
  - Goodbye, on the Mersey
  - The Two Friends
- Viktor Vasnetsov
  - Alenushka
  - Three Tsarevnas of the Underground Kingdom
- James McNeill Whistler – Portrait of Lady Meux in two completed versions:
  - Arrangement in Black, No. 5
  - Harmony in Pink and Grey

== Births ==
- January 4 – Wilhelm Lehmbruck, German sculptor (suicide 1919)
- January 5 – Pablo Gargallo, Aragonese painter and sculptor (died 1934)
- February 4 – Fernand Léger, French painter (died 1955)
- February 11
  - Carlo Carrà, Italian painter (died 1966)
  - Robert Borlase Smart, English painter and critic (died 1947)
- April 10 – William John Leech, Irish painter (died 1968)
- April 16 – Fortunino Matania, Italian-born illustrator and war artist (died 1963)
- July 12 – Natalia Goncharova, Russian theatrical costume and set designer, painter and illustrator (died 1962)
- July 28 – Léon Spilliaert, Belgian symbolist painter and graphic artist (died 1946)
- July 29 – Jessie Traill, Australian printmaker (died 1967)
- August 4 – Wenzel Hablik, Bohemian painter, graphic artist, designer (died 1934)
- October 4 - René Gimpel, French artbdealer (died 1945)
- October 25 – Pablo Picasso, Spanish painter, draughtsman and sculptor (died 1973)
- December 8 – Albert Gleizes, French painter (died 1953)
- December 31 – Max Pechstein, German painter (died 1955)
- undated
  - William Conor, Irish painter (died 1968)
  - Nazmi Ziya Güran, Turkish painter (died 1937)

== Deaths ==
- January 3 – Anna McNeill Whistler, "Whistler's Mother" (born 1804)
- January 24 – James Collinson, English Pre-Raphaelite painter (born 1825)
- February 9 – Jacques-Édouard Gatteaux, French sculptor and medal engraver (born 1788)
- March 11 – Thomas Brigstocke, Welsh portrait painter (born 1809)
- May 24 – Samuel Palmer, English painter, etcher and lithographer (born 1805)
- July 25 – Edward Charles Williams, English landscape painter (born 1807)
- December 6 – Thomas Skinner, English etcher (poisoned; born 1819)
- December 13 – John Quidor, American painter (born 1801)
- December 14 – Berndt Godenhjelm, Finnish painter (born 1799)
- December 21 - Francesco Hayez, Italian historical, portrait and political painter (born 1791)
