= Marvila, Lisbon =

Marvila
- Civil parish
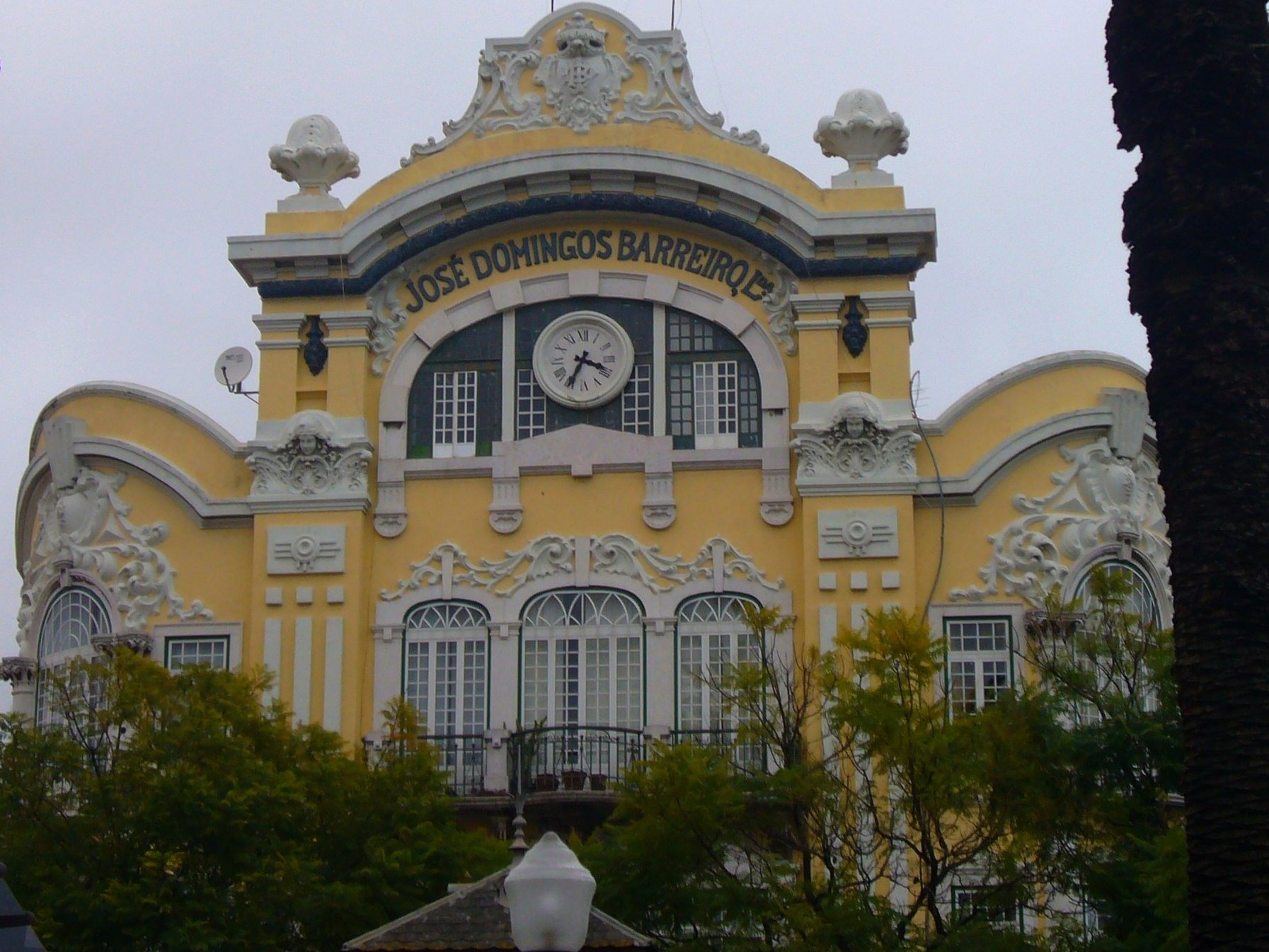
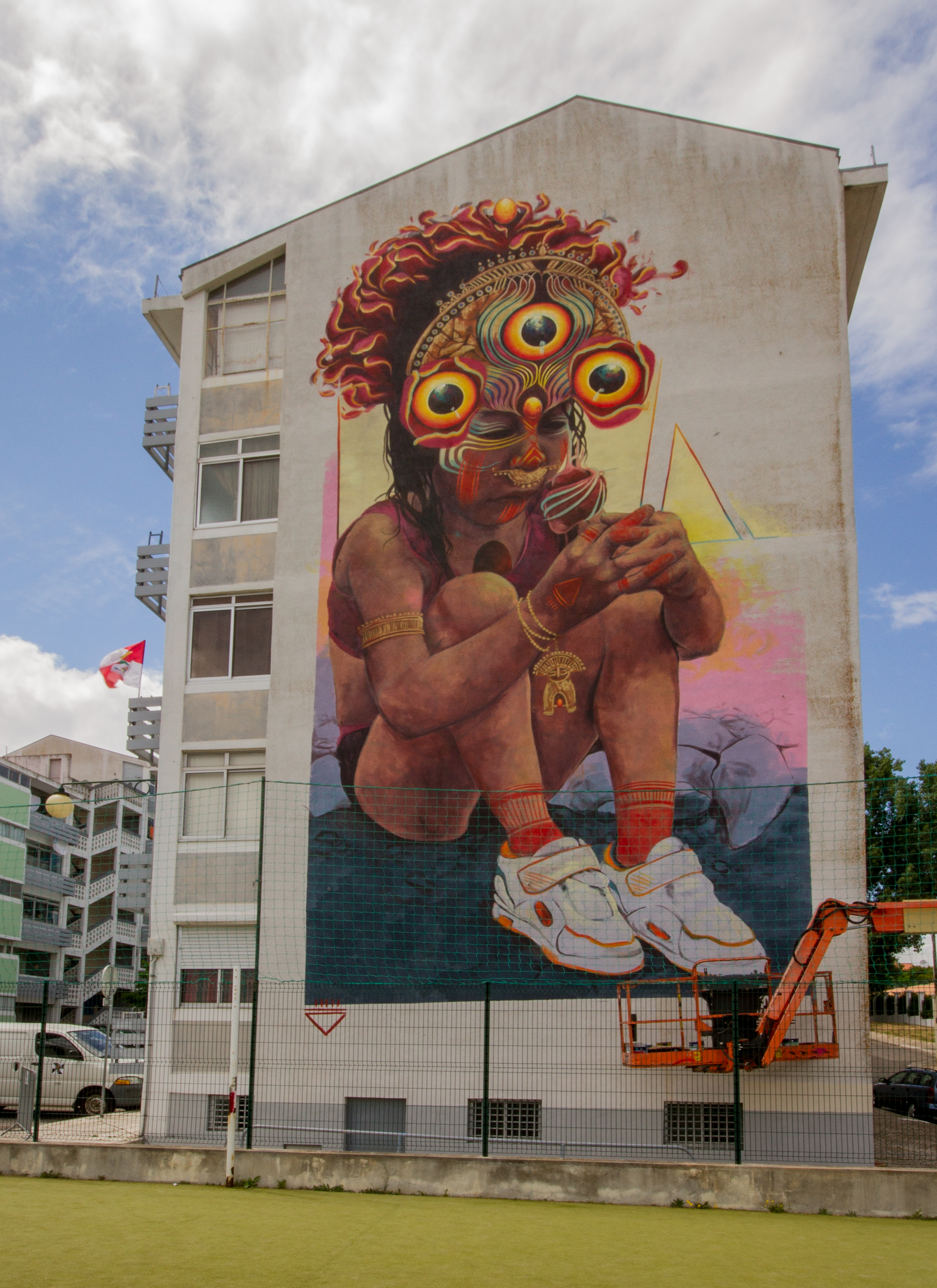
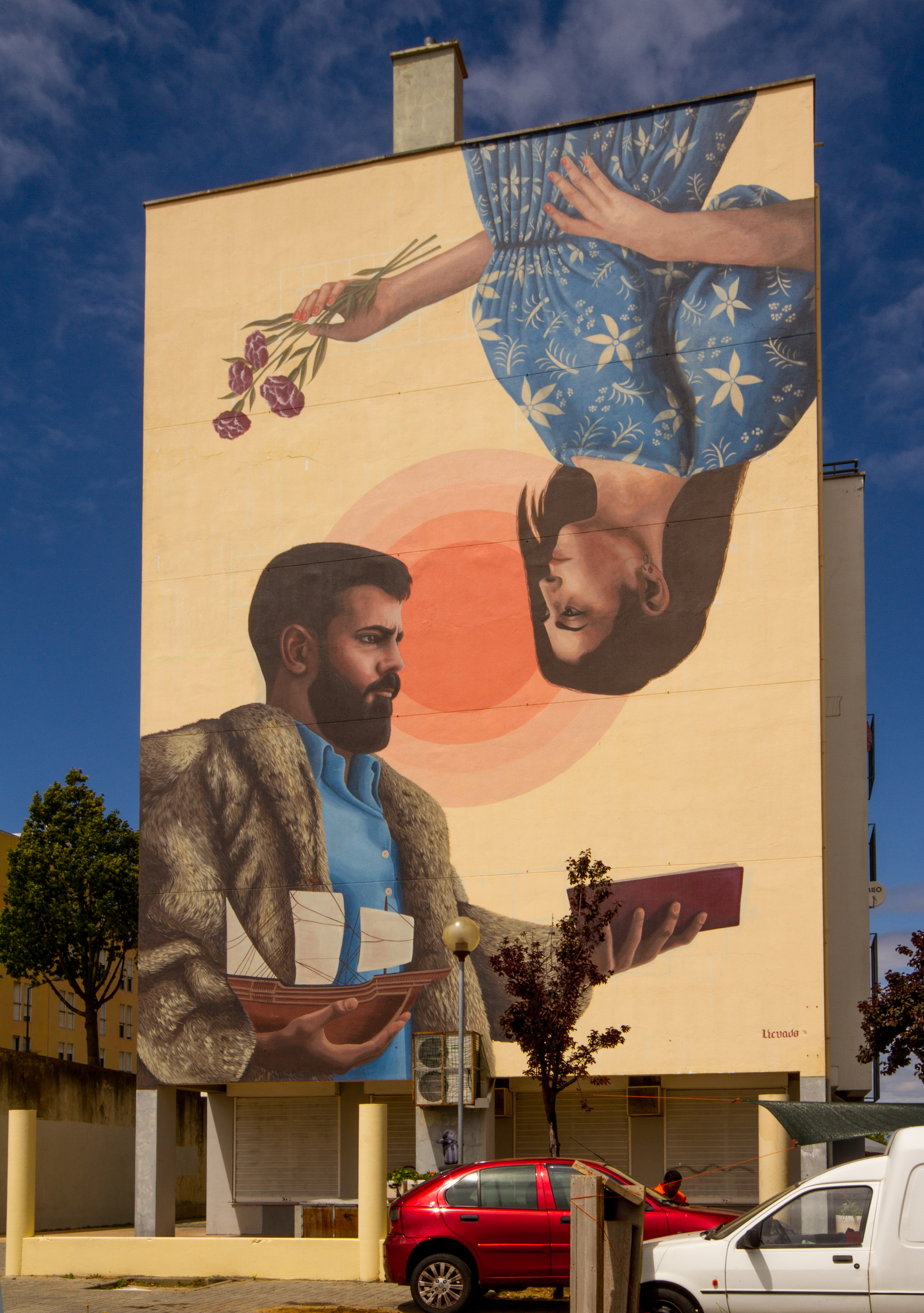
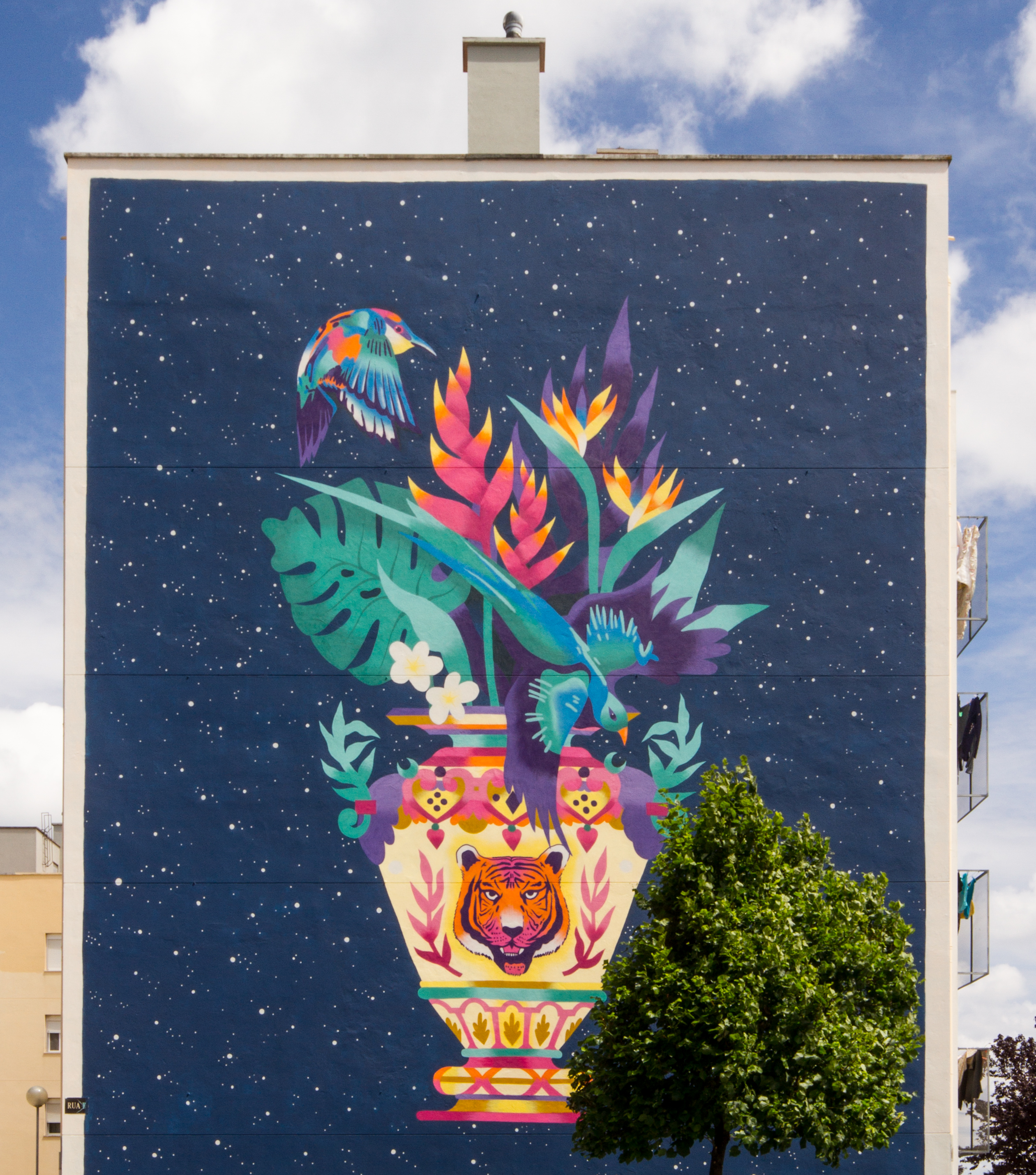
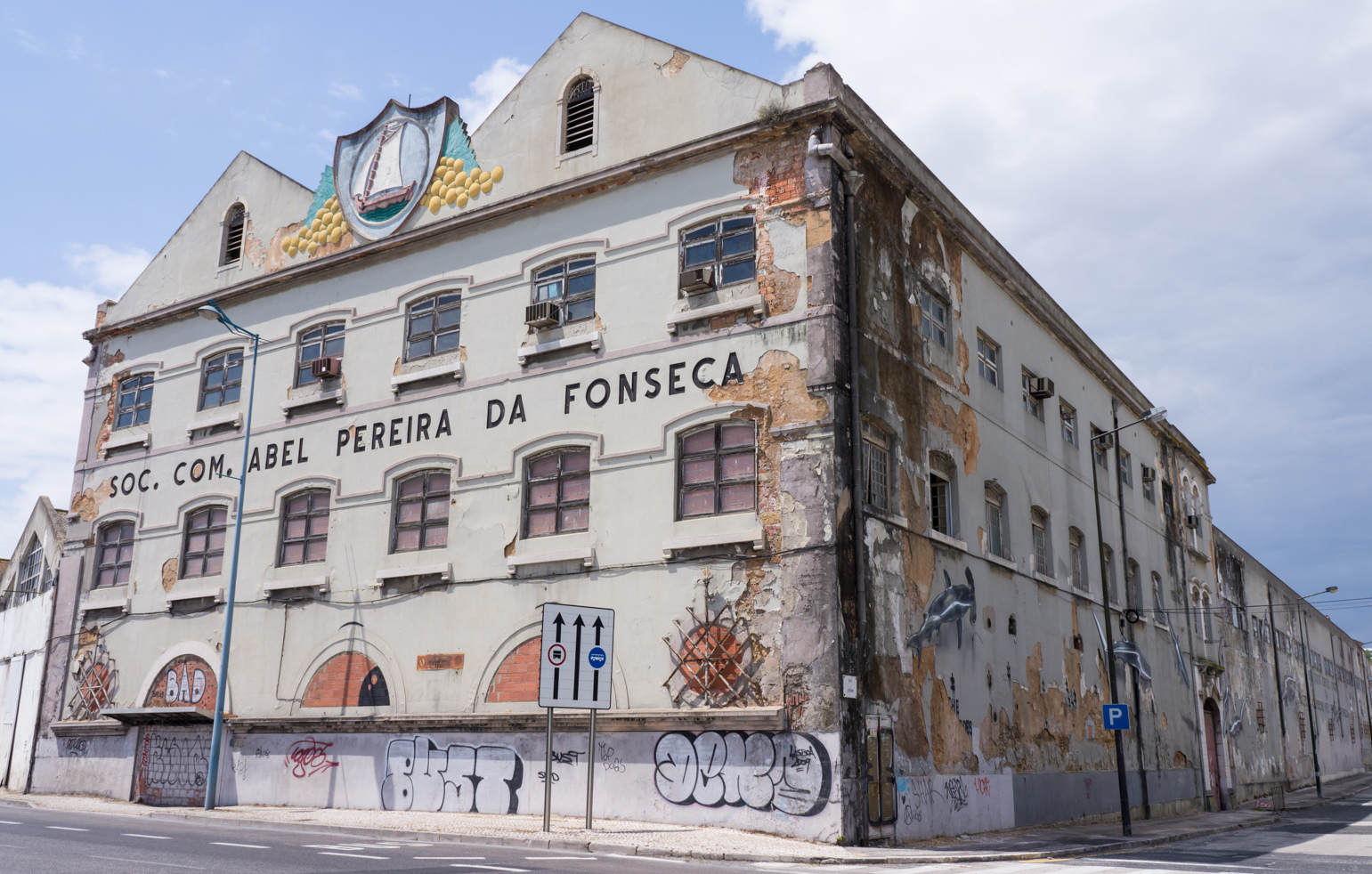
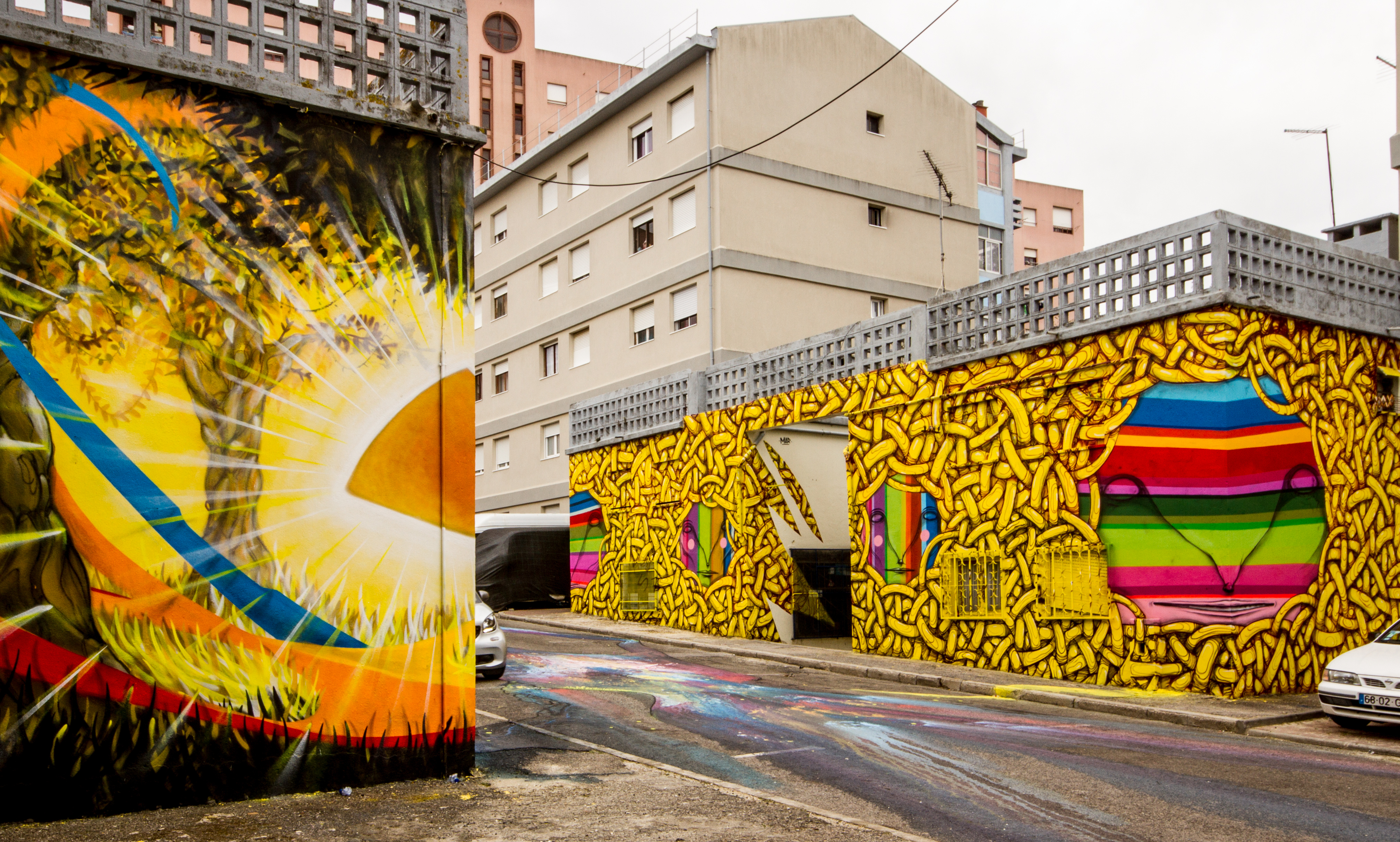
- Clockwise: Fábrica José Domingos Barreiro; Street art in Marvila; Armazéns Pereira Fonseca

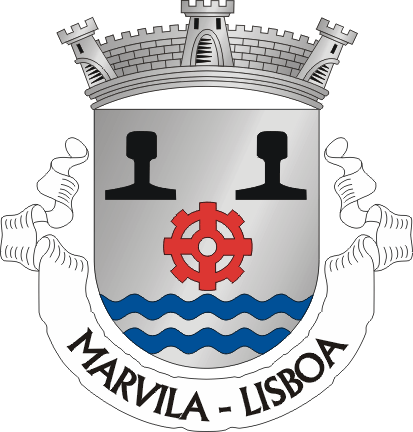
- Coat of arms

- Coordinates: 38.745°N 9.104°W
- Country: Portugal
- Region: Lisbon
- Metropolitan area: Lisbon
- District: Lisbon
- Municipality: Lisbon

Area
  - Total: 7.12 km^{2} (2.75 sq mi)

Population (2021)
  - Total: 35,479
  - Density: 4,980/km^{2} (12,900/sq mi)
- Time zone: UTC+00:00 (WET)
  - Summer (DST): UTC+01:00 (WEST)
- Website: http://www.jf-marvila.pt/

Marvila (Portuguese pronunciation: [mɐɾˈvilɐ]) is a freguesia (civil parish) and typical quarter of Lisbon, the capital city of Portugal. Located in eastern Lisbon, Marvila is to the southwest of Parque das Nações north of Beato, and east of Alvalade. The population in 2021 was 35,479.

== History ==
Marvila has been inhabited since the founding of Portugal. It is one of the most typical neighborhoods in the eastern part of the city of Lisbon. Until the 19th century, there were numerous country houses in this area, surrounded by orchards due to the fertility of the banks of the Tagus.

Until recently, Marvila was an essentially rural parish, where farms and orchards proliferated. Even today, they are easy to spot: Quinta dos Ourives, Quinta da Rosa, Quinta das Flores, Quinta das Amendoeiras, Quinta do Leal, Quinta do Marquês de Abrantes etc. These properties generally belonged to families from northern Portugal, and supplied the street markets spread throughout the neighborhood and, later, throughout the capital.

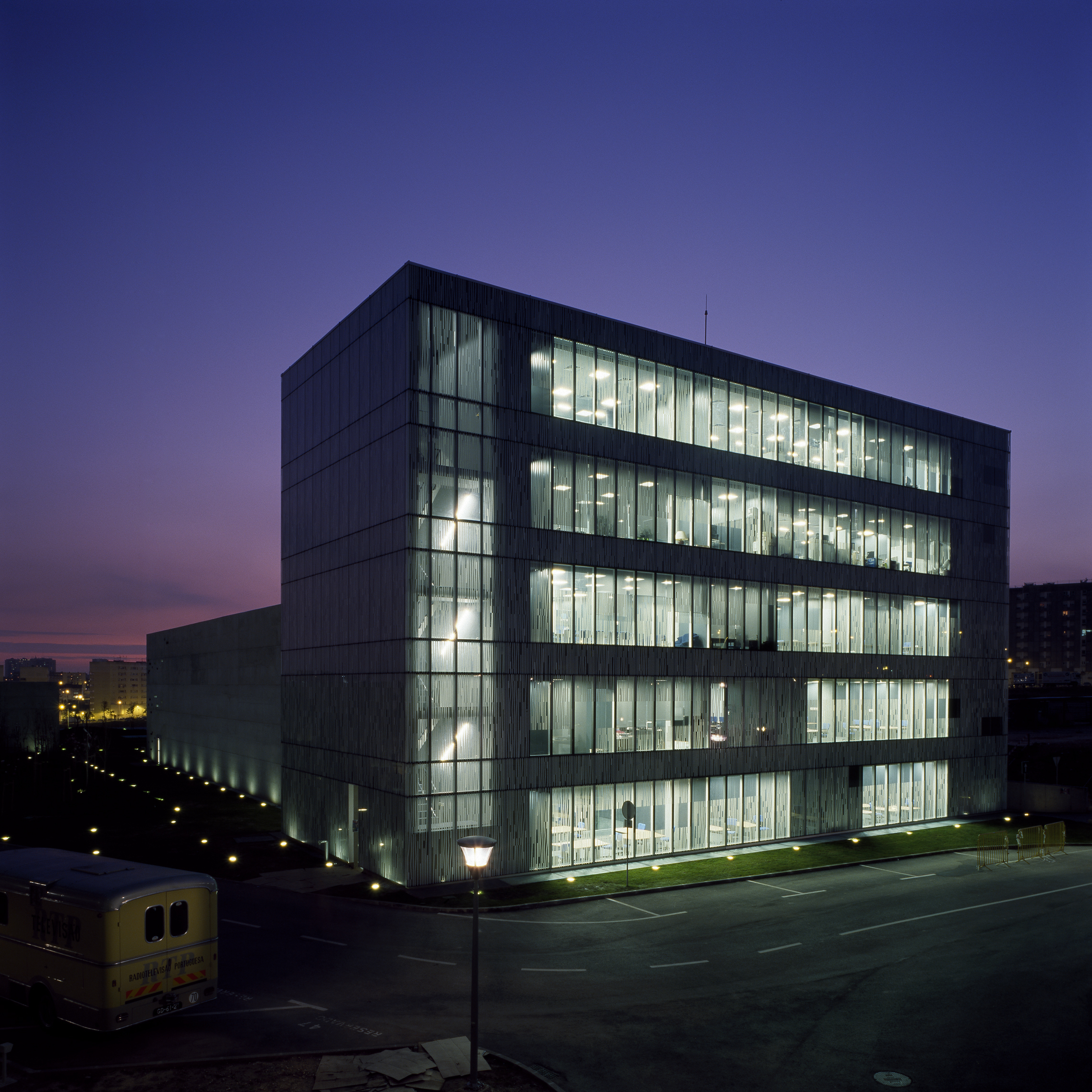
RTP headquarters in Marvila

At the old Praça da Ribeira market, merchandise arrived transported by carts. This population originally from the north brought many of their habits and customs, namely, the Feira da Espiga, which may have its origins in a custom from northern market gardeners. But from a rural area, Marvila transformed, over the years, into an urban area with a neighborhood and factory look. However, traces of great horticultural activity can still be seen today. The Marquês de Abrantes Palace, on Marvila Street, or Mitra Palace, on Açúcar Street, are true examples of the various manor houses that were built there. There were also plenty of religious monuments, such as the old Marvila Monastery. In the 20th century, the installation of manufacturing units continued from Rua do Açúcar to Braço de Prata. The cooperages on Rua Capitão Leitão and the wine warehouses of Abel Pereira da Fonseca (who, shortly before he died, told his descendants "as long as the Tagus has water, Lisbon should never lack wine") date back to this period. Today, these warehouses have been transformed into cultural centers.

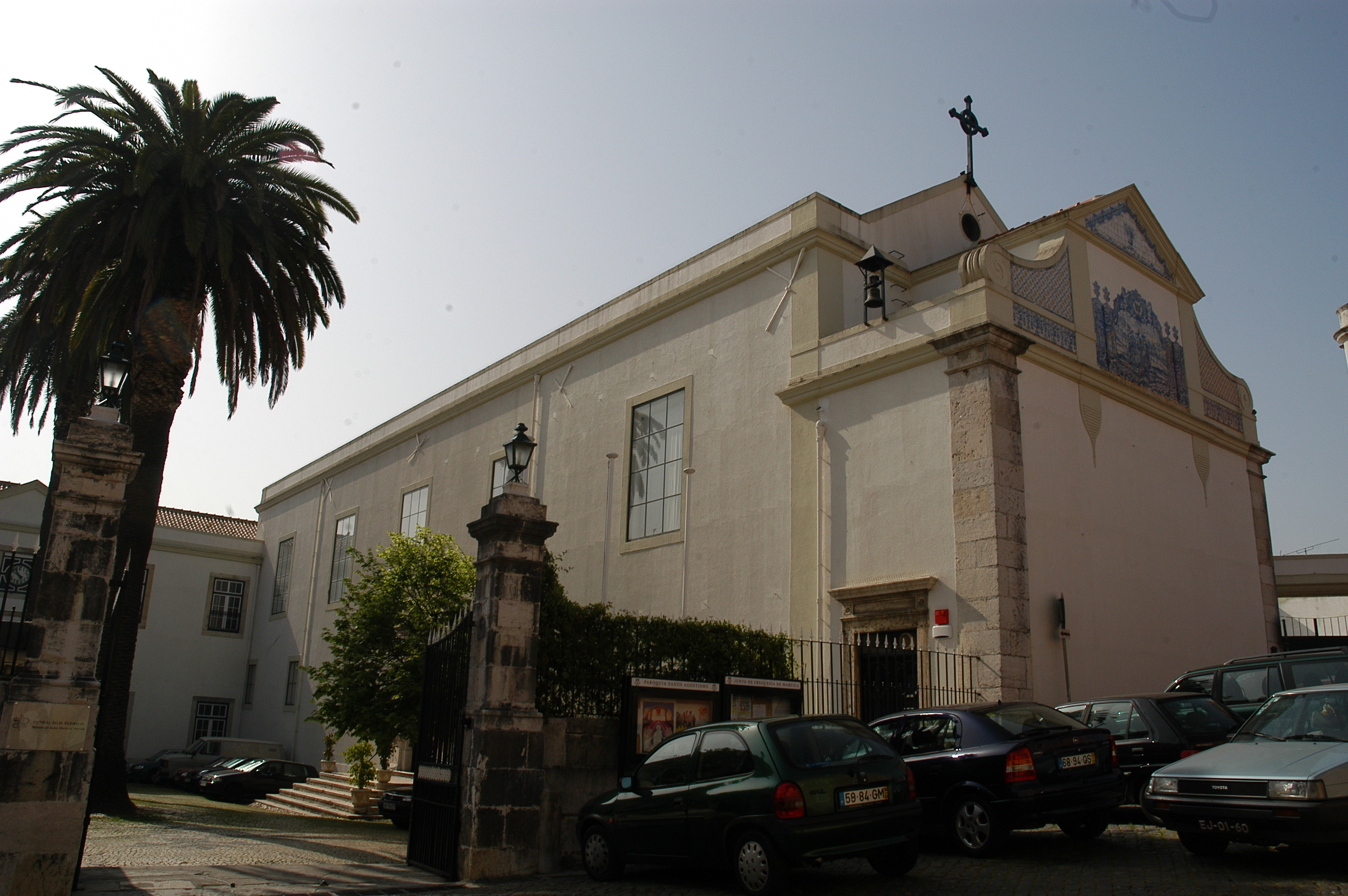
Parish Church of Saint Augustine in Marvila

Due to the high presence of factories, the Eastern zone of Lisbon was a working-class region in which figures of the Portuguese Communist Party (PCP), disguised, used to supervise and organise resistance movements, namely in the neighborhoods of Xabregas or Marvila. One notable PCP official active in the area was Fernanda de Paiva Tomás.

The current Marvila is a parish created by the decree-law 42,142 of February 7, 1959. It is a very significant part of the peripheral area of a large, rapidly growing European city.

The central area of Marvila, in Chelas, saw the emergence of the first shanty towns in the 1950s and 1960s, inhabited primarily by people from the Beira region who predominantly worked at the Fábrica Nacional de Sabões, Fábrica de Borracha, Fábrica dos Fósforos, and the wine warehouses of Abel Pereira da Fonseca.

Many of these shantytowns eventually merged and became one of the largest shanty settlements in eastern Lisbon and came to be known as the "Bairro Chinês" (Chinese Neighborhood). The name stemmed from imagery seen in films of the time, depicting junks and floating villages at the mouths of Chinese rivers. These films also portrayed vast concentrations of wooden houses scattered along narrow and labyrinthine alleyways, densely populated with people. There was a second version for the name of the same neighborhood, which originated from the possibility that the owner or tenant of some of the land had Oriental features. By 1965, the shanty town hosted 10,000 people divided in 2,000 shacks. It is important to remind that, at the same time, in the Lisbon area around 500,000 people (or a third of the total population, of which 44% were illiterate) lived in 115,000 shacks.

Marvila is characterised by the large proportion of the population living in public housing, divided amongst 10 main neighborhoods originating in shanty towns. Around 22,000 people live in these neighbourhoods, the total ascending to 24,500 when taking into account also PRODAC neighbourhood. All in all, it is estimated that up to 70% of the parish population might be living in public housing neighbourhoods. They were built between 1970 (PRODAC) although the majority of the relocations from shacks to apartments occurred in the 1980s and 1990s, with the last buildings dating from 2001 to 2002 and major relocations ending by 2003. The neighbourhoods, all characterised by a rich and diverse history, are, in order of construction:

== Demographics ==
=== Demographic statistics ===
Marvila before and after the 2012 Portuguese administrative reform

=== Historical resident population (before the 2012 Administrative Reform) ===
Historical population
Year	Pop.	±%
1960	20,001	—
1970	27,584	+37.9%
1981	40,689	+47.5%
1991	47,827	+17.5%
2001	38,767	−18.9%
2011	37,793	−2.5%
2021	35,479	−6.1%
Source: INE

The resident population recorded according to Censuses carried over the years is shown in the following table for Marvila. It is noteworthy that Marvila lost 12,348 people from 1991 to 2021 or 25.82% of its 1991 population in just 30 years, not having recorded a single population gain since 1991.

=== Demographic statistics ===
- Age

The last censuses show that the parish's population is ageing at a fast pace: in 2021 23.81% of the population was below 25 and, at the same time, almost a quarter (24.07%) of the residents was 65 or older.

Distribution of Population by Age Groups
Year	0-14 Years	0-14 Years %	15-24 Years	15-24 Years %	25-64 Years	25-64 Years %	> 65 Years	> 65 Years %
2021	4,698	13.24%	3,751	10.57%	18,489	52.12%	8,541	24.07%

- Religion
Religion in Marvila (Census 2021)
1. Catholicism (71.9%)
2. Protestantism (2.94%)
3. Jehovah's Witnesses and Other Christian (2.24%)
4. Orthodoxy (0.39%)
5. Islam (0.77%)
6. Hinduism (1.78%)
7. Buddhism (0.64%)
8. Judaism (0.03%)
9. Other religions (0.33%)
10. No religion (19.0%)

The parish is predominantly Catholic and 77.50% of the population aged 15 or above are followers of a Christian or Jeovah's Witness denomination as of 2021.

Interestingly, around 18.96% of the population does not practice a religion and is thus non religious.

The presence of minor religions such as Islam, Hinduism and Buddhism (3.54% of the population amongst the three) is probably due to an increasing community of people coming from India, Pakistan, Bangladesh or Nepal.

- Immigration

In 2021, 5.42% of the population of the parish was constituted by foreigners. In particular, amongst women foreigners were 5.48% of the total. This means that in Marvila there are 1,924 resident foreigners, a sharp increase from 2011, when there were 1,311 resident foreigners (3.47%). Since the foreign population increased by 613 people from 2011 to 2021 and given that the total population of the parish decreased by 2,314 units in the same timespan, it is noteworthy that the total population would have decreased even more were not it for the increase in immigration. The largest group of foreigners is constituted by nationals of PALOP countries (552 people or -2.47% since 2011) Brazilians (495 people or +95.65% since 2011), Chinese (375 people or +74.41%) and people from the Indian Subcontinent, most notably Nepalis and Indians, totaling 129 people, or recording an increase of +258.33% since 2011. Moreover, the presence of foreigners is even more noticeable amongst the pupils attending government-fund schools in the parish.

Dealing with the foreign-born population, 11.45% of the parish's population was born abroad as of 2021. The most common countries of birth were PALOP countries (2,061 people), Brazil (707 people), China (309 people), Spain (137 people) and the Indian Subcontinent (289 people). Of the Portuguese nationals born abroad, the most common countries of birth were PALOP countries (1,581 people) and Brazil (219 people), all countries having ancient historical ties with Portugal as well as a rooted migration history towards the country, and who are, thus, more likely to have acquired Portuguese citizenship along the years.

Moreover, as of 2021 in the parish there were 2,206 people who have entered Portugal after 2010, constituting 6.22% of the population. Of those with recent migrant background, 18.90% were Portuguese nationals returning from a period of emigration abroad.

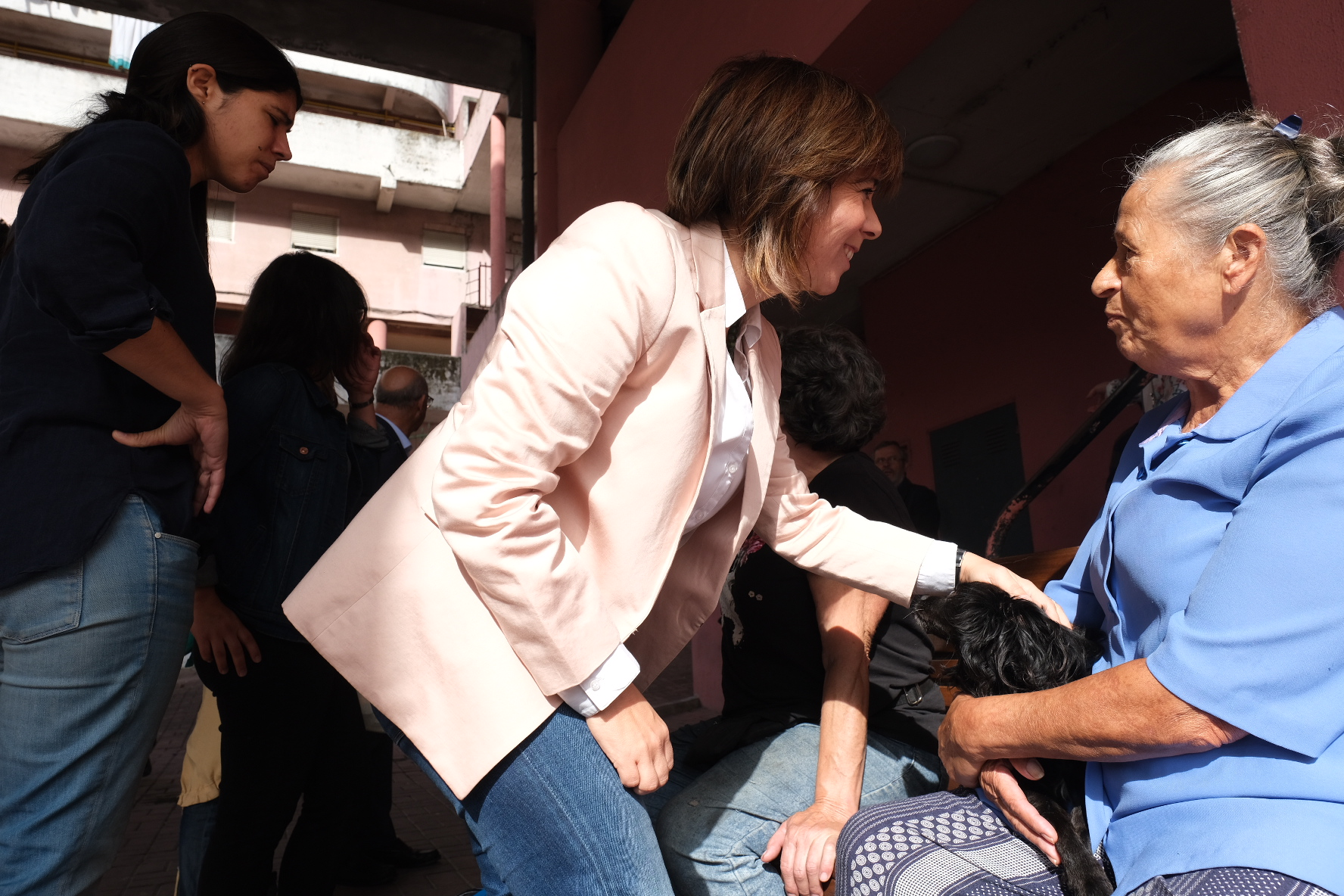
Elders in the parish of Marvila. According to the 2021 Census, immigrants are younger than local residents.

Amongst the Portuguese, 5,474 had already lived abroad as of 2021 (12.54% of the Portuguese population). The majority of those having lived in Angola and Mozambique (1,574 people) entered Portugal in the Seventies (1,058 people or 58.77%), following the independence of the two former colonies (so called retornados). Those coming from countries hosting large Portuguese emigrant communities such as France, Spain, Germany, Switzerland, Luxembourg or Belgium (804 people) have mostly entered Portugal after 1991 (74.50%), probably due to the development of the Portuguese economy since its accession to the EU. Interestingly, 59.56% of the Portuguese nationals having lived in the UK and residing in the parish, has left the UK after 2016, (date of the Brexit referendum).

If the whole population (regardless of the nationality held) is taken into account, then 16.65% of the parish's population has already lived abroad for at least one year as of 2021, with PALOP countries, EU countries, Brazil the United Kingdom and China being the most commonly cited countries of previous residence.

== Education ==
The parish serves as seat of Instituto Superior de Engenharia de Lisboa (ISEL)

== Health ==
The establishment of the Health Center, which includes a family health unit, has brought benefits to Lóios, as has the Association "Tempo de Mudar para o Desenvolvimento do Bairro dos Lóios," which has contributed to social improvement in the neighborhood. Improving public space and quality of life in the neighborhood has also been a concern of the Marvila Parish Council.

== Economy ==
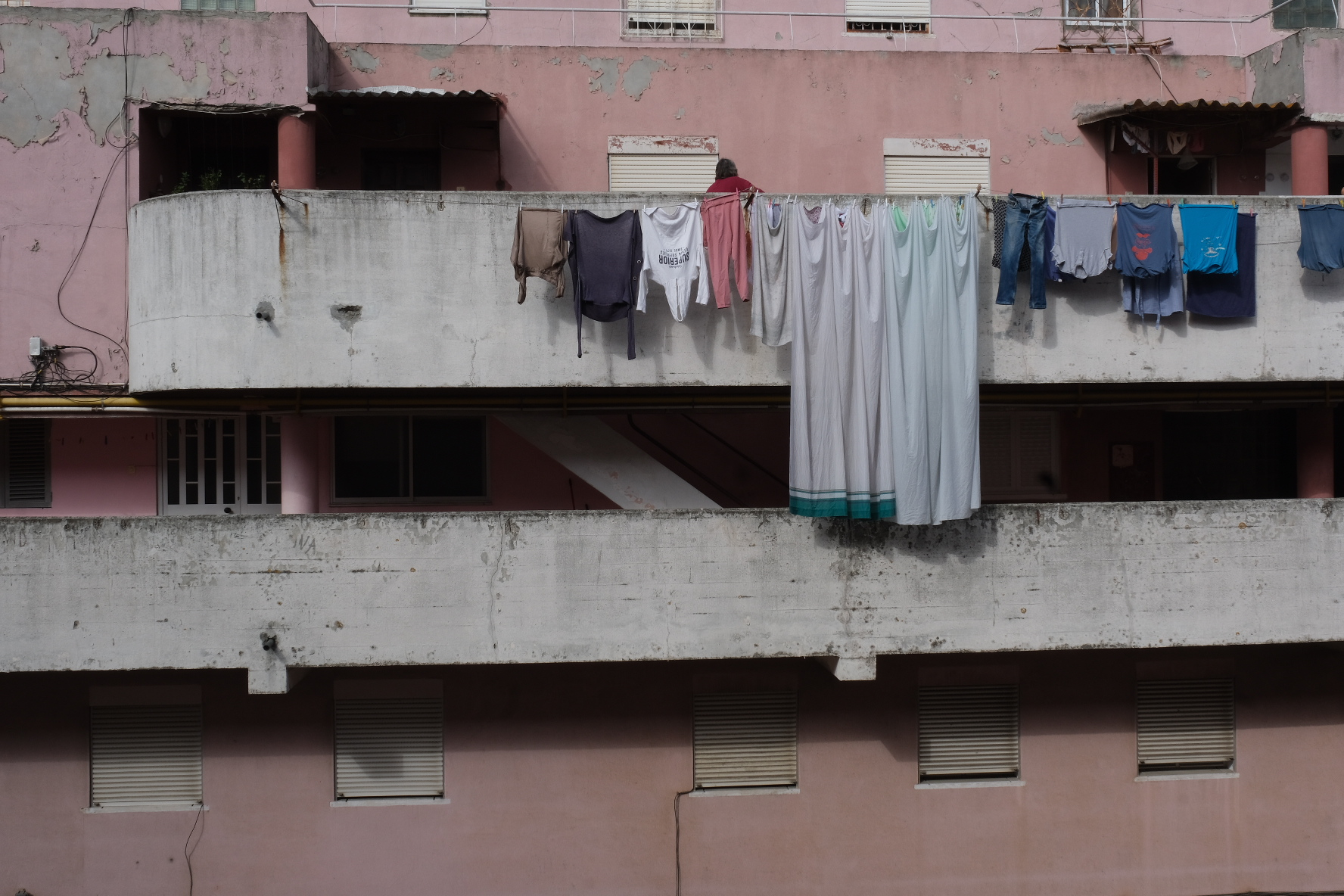
Public housing in Marvila

In the parish of Marvila there are 2,111 residents who, as of 2021, were unemployed. Of these, 42.49% received a state-fund subsidy or pension (41.34% in Lisbon). In 2021 the unemployment rate in the parish is considerably higher than the one recorded for Lisbon and for Portugal as a whole, standing at 13.68%. In the same year, Portugal as a whole had an unemployment rate of 8.13% that has progressively decreased to 6.1% in 2023. As the statistics dealing with unemployment at the parish level are available only every 10 years, the current (2023) unemployment rate in Marvila is unknown. Amongst youth aged 15–24 the unemployment rate in 2021 in the parish stood at 29.70%, 58.99% higher than in the rest of the country.

On the other hand, in 2021 13,323 residents were employed, of which 79.94% were employees and 17.58% were independent workers. Below is the table showing the employment rate per age group. The low share of people aged 20–24 employed is due to the fact that many are still in education (e.g. university) while the low proportion of those in employment aged 60–64 is due to many being early pensioners.

2021 Census data	Age group								
2021 Census data	20-24	25-29	30-34	35-39	40-44	45-49	50-54	55-59	60-64
Share of people in employment	40.59%	64.35%	71.27%	72.19%	71.48%	71.32%	68.70%	61.63%	43.38%

Dealing with commuting, the residents of Marvila spent 24.22 minutes of daily commuting, 2 minutes more than the average inhabitant of Lisbon.

== Landmarks ==
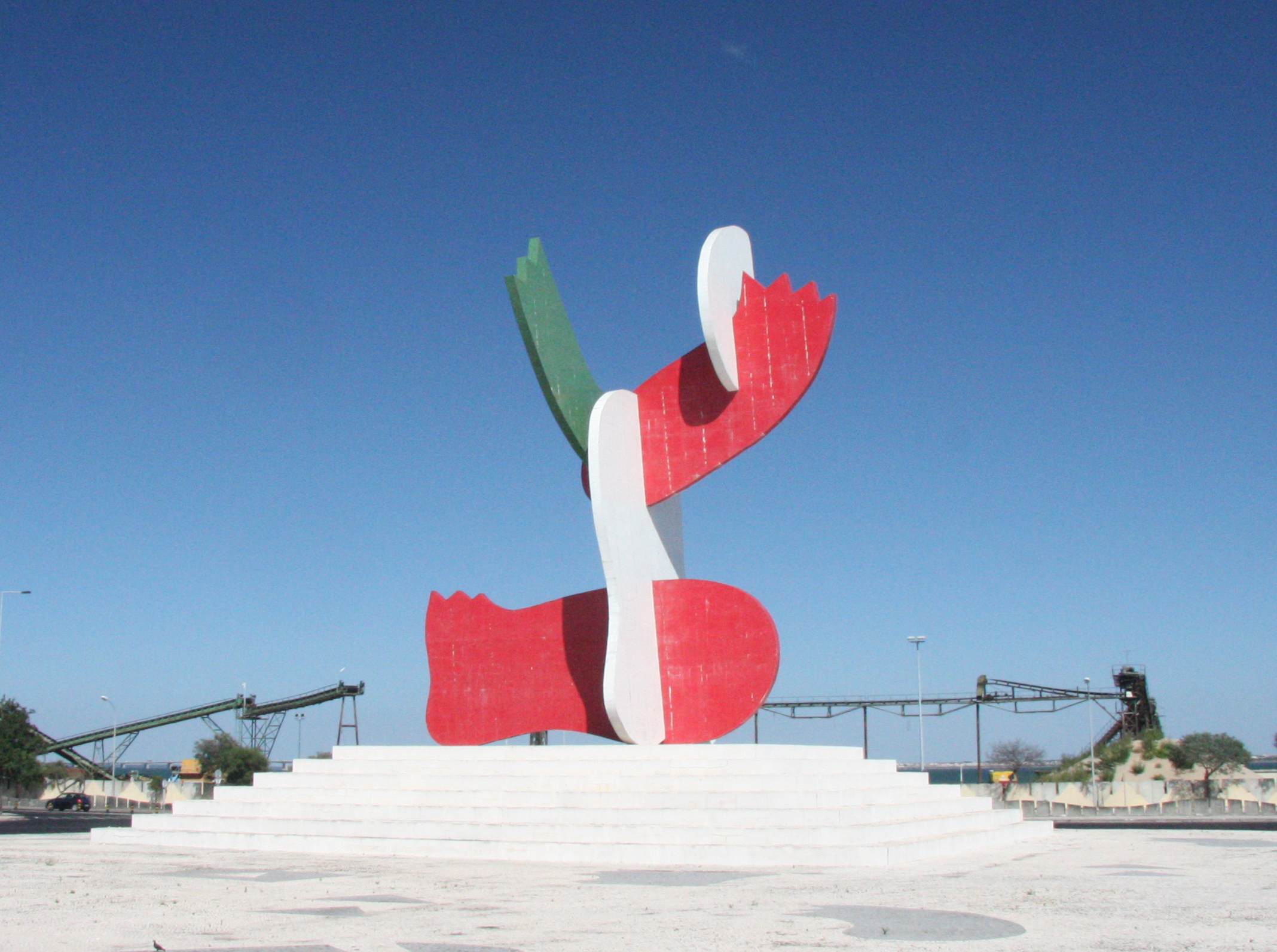
Aos Construtores da cidade monument

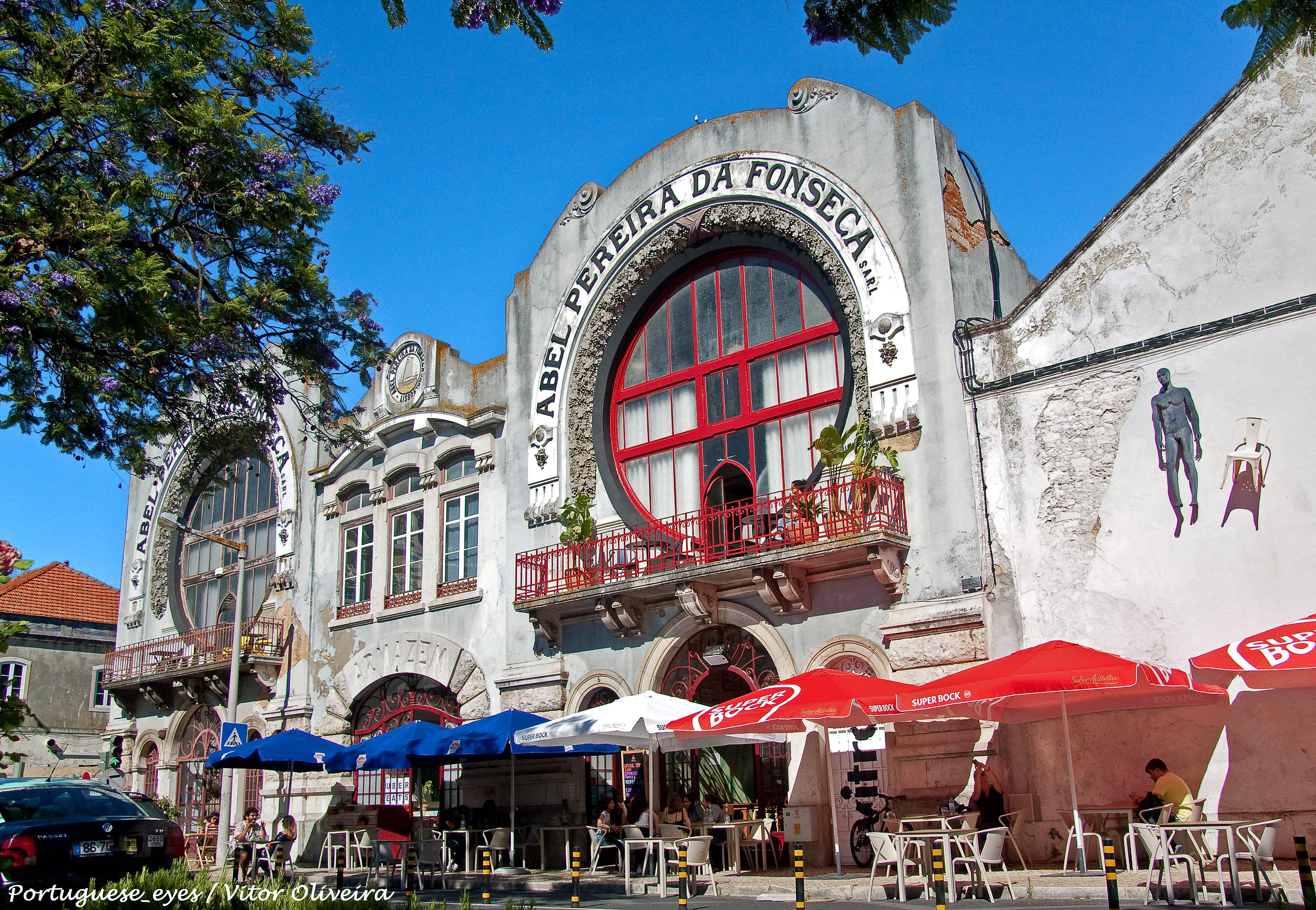
Armazéns Vinícolas Abel Pereira da Fonseca

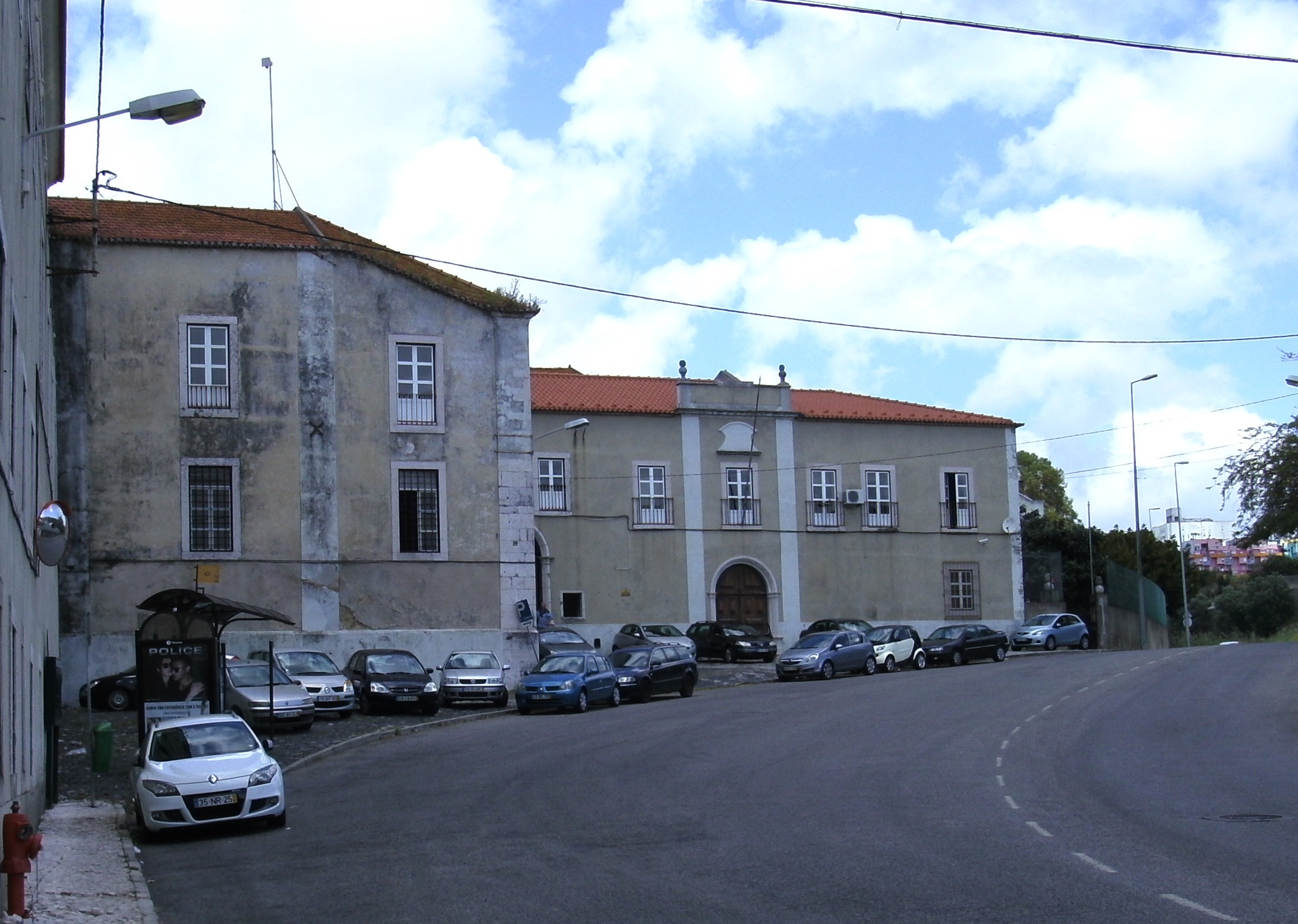
Orthodox church of Chelas

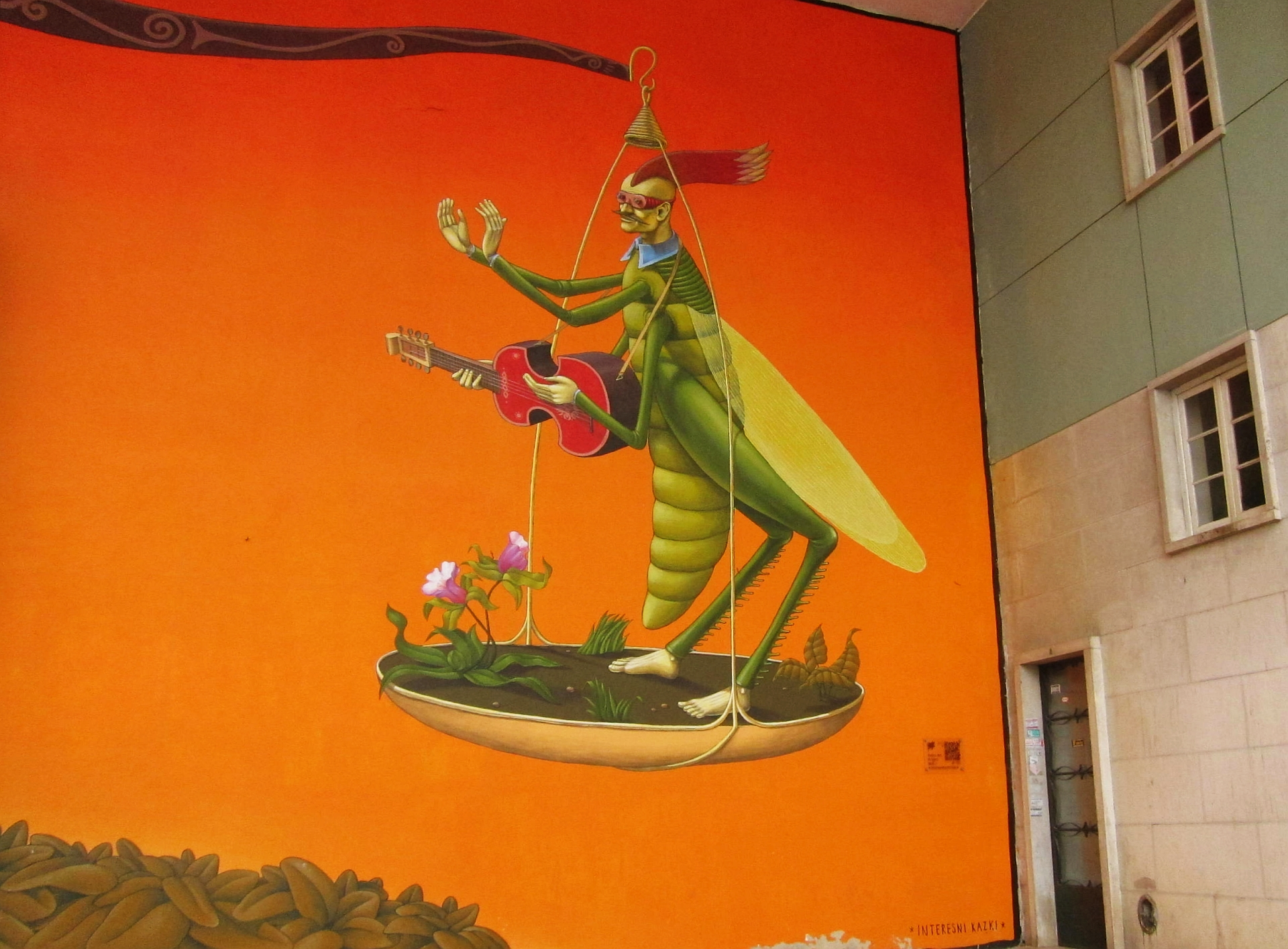
Detail of a mural (2013) by Interesni Kazki, a duo consisting of two Ukrainian artists, commissioned by Underdogs Gallery

- A Tabaqueira: Industrial archaeology building dating from 1928
- Aos Construtores da Cidade monument: Monument inaugurated in 1999
- Armazéns Vinícolas Abel Pereira da Fonseca: Ancient industrial building dating from 1910, now used as an event venue
- Chafariz na Rua do Vale Formoso de Cima: Ancient water fountain
- Fábrica Braço de Prata: The "Braço de Prata War Material Factory," built 1904–1908, evolved from artillery production to a cultural center. Notable for its 1953 explosion, it peaked during the Ultramar War, now housing diverse amenities
- Fábrica de Borracha Luso-Belga: Example of Industrial archaeology dating from 1895. This factory, the sole rubber transformation hub in Portugal, produced various rubber and ebonite products, including irrigation pipes, gaskets, footwear rubber sheets, belts, surgical items, hot water bags, soles, rubber heels, rubber balls, and toys. It closed in 1975 due to bankruptcy.
- Igreja e convento de Chelas (Convento de São Félix e Santo Adrião de Chelas): Its origins date back to a Visigothic occupation of ancient Roman structures, although the first surviving material evidence dates back to the 17th century. Of particular significance is the Manueline portal of the church. It is now an Orthodox church
- Igreja de Santa Clara de Assis: Catholic church built by the Franciscan order in the second half of the 20th century
- Igreja de São Maximiliano Kolbe: Catholic church built by the Franciscan order in 1983 in Bairro da Flamenga neighbourhood
- Igreja das Missionárias da Caridade (Mother Teresa)
- Igreja Paroquial de Santo Agostinho a Marvila: Including a convent (Convento de Nossa Senhora da Conceição) and chapels such as Capela da Mansão de Santa Maria de Marvila and Capela do Asilo dos Velhos, the building dates from 1660
- Palácio da Mitra: Palace dating from the 17th century
- Palácio dos Condes de Figueiró: Palace dating from the 17th century
- Parque da Belavista geomonumento: natural formation dating from the Miocene. During the Lower Miocene, the Lisbon area experienced seasonal river flooding, providing habitats for ancestors of elephants and wild boars. Nearby seas formed limestone deposits containing marine fossils.
- Rua Capitão Leitão geomonumento: natural formation dating from the Miocene
- Parque da Belavista geomonumento: natural formation dating from the Miocene
- Underdogs Gallery: Cultural centre inaugurated in 2013

== Sport ==
Marvila, due to the large number of sports facilities and sports events organised, has the nickname of freguesia do desporto (lit. sports' parish). Although not used in everyday life, the "motto" is often used to promote public initiatives.

Amongst many institutions found in the parish, there is the Seat of Clube Oriental de Lisboa (football and swimming). The parish also hosts the Estádio Engenheiro Carlos Salema, a football stadium built in 1949 with a capacity for 4,000 people.

Since 2012 the parish hosts the "Zumba colours" festival in June.

In 2023, the multi-sports field at Marquês de Abrantes was inaugurated.

== Culture ==
The parish hosts two important orchestras, namely Sociedade Musical 3 de Agosto de 1885, established in 1885, and Associação para o Desenvolvimento Cultural e Social de Marvila established in 1993. The parish also offers a free monthly newspaper for all Marvila inhabitants.

Numerous institutions, associations, and projects with cultural and artistic influences are present in the parish. Entities such as the theater company Cepa Torta, Casa Conveniente, the Guinean Association for Social Solidarity in Marvila, and Batoto Yetu play a crucial role in social integration and cultural development in the neighborhood.

Marvila is also known for thriving on the essence of urban art. It embodies a genuine urban context steeped in the history and characteristics of street art. In Portugal, this neighborhood can be considered a cradle of urban art, as it centralizes its essence and encompasses all expressions of urban art. The artist Sam the Kid, revered as the king of hip-hop in Portugal, represents Chelas and Zone J; this Marvila neighborhood is adorned with graffiti, another form of street art; and, almost organically, one can find groups of young people listening to hip-hop and making rap music on the streets. Additionally, there are schools with hip-hop dance groups.

== Notable people ==
- Luís of Portugal, Duke of Beja (1506–1555): second son of King Manuel I of Portugal and his second wife, Maria of Aragon. He participated in the Conquest of Tunis
- Helena de Távora (1634–1720): Portuguese poet of the 17th and 18th centuries
- Arcângela Maria da Assunção (? - 1737): Portuguese religious figure
- António de Castro (1741–1814): Bishop of Porto, Patriarch of Lisbon, and Governor of Portugal during the Transfer of the Portuguese court to Brazil following Napoleon's Invasion of Portugal (1807)
- Leonor de Almeida Portugal (1750–1839): Portuguese noblewoman, painter, and poet. Commonly known by her nickname, Alcipe, the Marquise was a prime figure in the Portuguese Neoclassic a proto-Romantic literary scene. She was confined for around 20 years in a convent in nowadays Marvila.
- Caldas Aulete (1823–1878): Portuguese teacher, lexicographer, grammarian and politician, author of several textbooks and initiator of the Contemporary Dictionary of the Portuguese Language
- Rogério Pipi (1922–2019): Portuguese footballer who played mainly as a forward
- Sofia Neuparth (1962): Portuguese dancer and choreographer
- Aldina Duarte (1967): Portuguese fadista
- Carlos Resende (1971): Portuguese former handball player and current coach of FC Porto
- Boss AC (1975): Cape Verdean-born Portuguese rapper
- Sam the Kid (1979): Portuguese rapper and producer from Chelas
- MC Snake (1979–2010): Portuguese rapper who died due to a police intervention in Alcântara
- Bruno Candé (1980–2020): Portuguese actor, from the Casa Conveniente theater company. He was murdered in 2020 in Moscavide, victim of a racial hate crime
- Marinho (1983): Portuguese former professional footballer who played as a winger
- Nuno Varela (1984): One of the main drivers of the hip hop movement in Portugal and a social entrepreneur dedicated to community projects
- Matay (1987): Cape Verdean-born Portuguese popular singer, especially known for his single O Que Tu Dás
- Rita Vian (1991): Portuguese singer and composer
- João Amorim (1991): Portuguese former professional footballer who played as a right-back
- Felisberto Pereira Tavares (?-2017): Portuguese-Cape Verdean rapper known as Beto Diguetto
- Sara Correia (1993): Portuguese singer, specializing in the fado genre
- Fábio Carvalho (2002): Portuguese footballer
