= Paulo Henrique (choreographer) =

Portuguese choreographer and multimedia performance artist

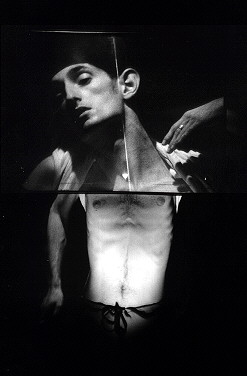
Henrique in "From Now On"

Paulo Henrique (born Paulo Henrique Carreira Jorge; 1968 in Luanda, Angola) is a Portuguese choreographer and multimedia performance artist. As a choreographer, he has created several performance and installation works, integrating different media such as video, sound, text, voice, and plastic arts. Since 2009 Paulo Henrique has been based in Paris, France.

== Biography ==
Originally from Luanda, Angola, Henrique's family moved to Leiria, Portugal, in 1975 as a result of the civil war in Angola. He studied at Forum Dança in Lisbon. In addition, he took part in several artistic residencies such as "European Choreographic Forum"/Shinkansen and "Korper – technik|Body – Technology". Paulo Henrique was awarded a grant from Centro Nacional de Cultura, the Gulbenkian Foundation and the Luso–American Foundation to attend the Lee Strasberg Theater Institute in New York, where he also attended the Film/Video Arts Institute. From 1997 to 1999, he undertook an internship with the Trisha Brown Dance Company and collaborated with various other artists and disciplines.

He has worked on projects and works with Vera Dentro, Bernardo Montet, Margarida Bettencout, Meg Stuart, Meredith Monk, Robert Flynt, Jack Shamblin, Lance Gries, Olga Mesa, Lidia Martinez, Madalena Vitorino, David Zambrano, Barbara Duchow. He has taught at Forum Dança, CEM, and Arte Total, and has been a guest lecturer at Brighton University (Postgraduate diploma in Digital Media Arts). Several of his works are now stored as part of the Digital Performance Archive (DPA) in London and his work has been discussed in the 2007 book "Digital Performance".

His work has been performed throughout Europe, Brazil, Africa, and in the United States at venues such as the Dance Theater Workshop and La Mama in New York, the Mousonturm in Frankfurt, and the Belém Cultural Center in Lisbon. He has had works commissioned by the Festival Danças Na Cidade and for Lisbon's Expo 98. Paulo Henrique was one of the first Portuguese artists to integrate new technology and video into the performances to create stage multimedia pieces.

== Projects ==
- "Discobulo" 1992
- "Piano" 1993
- "Ode", "White" (White) 1994
- "Flat Earth" (Flat Earth) 1994
- "From Now On" 1996
- "Minimally Invasive" 1998
- "Contract With The Skin" 2000,
- "Around One" 2002,
- "Suspended Lines [move//still]" + "Videoroom" Brighton Fringe Festival 2006
- "Surface Tension" Brighton Photo Fringe Festival 2006
- "DOC.10"|Dance&Video 2006/07, Box Nova CCB, Lisbon 2007
- "Surface Tension' + 'Autographs" Brighton Photo Fringe Festival 2008
- "Autographs + Surface Tension" at London photomonth 2009
- "Night Trip"|60x60 Dance, Stratford Theatre, London 2010
- "Frame & Re-Frame", Box Nova CCB, Lisbon 2010
- " Samples (Contract with The Skin)" at photolounge, part of photomonth, East London 2010
- "DOC.10"|Dance&Video|with Clara Leão Dance School|José Lucio da Silva Theater, Leiria (Portugal) 2010
- "Live Performance" + video screening of "Contract With The Skin", Anymous Festival, Plzen (Czech Republic) 2011
- "Man In The Park" performance/installation|'I Am This Also', Space Liberdade Provisoria, Lisbon 2012
- "Hacker", live-act/performance (Non-official)|'Appropriated Spaces' series|European Capital of Culture, Guimarães 2012
- "(in)translation", performance/video|Volksroom, Brussels 2012
- "Transformation ou métamorphose" – Vers un progrès ininterrompu – video/photography, Paris 2012
- "Minimally Invasive" (video) | artist collective|"Body and Bodies, transgressions and narratives”|MiMo, Image Museum, Leiria 2013
- "Vecteurs du Corps"12, Video-mapping José Budha, Semaine des cultures étrangères, Casa André de Gouveia, Paris 2013
- "Mémoire d'une image absent", (299 ways to come down the steps/Stars on the Stairs), Lieux Publics, Marseille European capital of culture, 2013
- "Vecteurs du Corps" (video) + "Contract With The Skin" (video), Special Effects Festival, New York, 2014
- Video Performance by Paulo Henrique, CHANTIERS d'EUROPE|Calouste Gulbenkian Paris, 2014
- "Un homme. Une machine" (video – improvisation), Intervention dance: Paulo Henrique, Digital Art: João Martinho Moura (WIDE/SIDE, 2015), video edition: Play Bleu: Arte total|GNRation Gallery, Braga, 2015.
- Crucial Interventions (video: Play Bleu) / GUELRA|Arte Total, Braga 2015
- Don't Look (video: Play Bleu) / GUELRA|Arte Total, Braga 2015
- Performance Act created for 'Corps et Artivisme', Paris 2019
- My body is made of other people's noise (my body is made of noise from others) / GUELRA – artistic residency / dance / multimedia – Arte Total and GNRation, Braga 2020

He has worked on projects and works with Vera Dentro, Bernardo Montet, Margarida Bettencout, Meg Stuart, Meredith Monk, Robert Flynt, Jack Shamblin, Lance Gries, Olga Mesa, Lidia Martinez, Madalena Vitorino, David Zambrano, Barbara Duchow. He has taught at Forum Dança, CEM, and Arte Total, and has been a guest lecturer at Brighton University (postgraduate diploma in digital media arts). Several of his works are now stored as part of the Digital Performance Archive (DPA) in London and his work has been discussed in the book "Digital Performance" by Steve Dixon, MIT Press, 2007.

== Collaborations ==
- 2020: Life Lines, livre photographie by Eric Rhein, Institue193,ISBN 978-1732848238
- 2019: Performance Act with Evelyne le Pollotec, invitation by Alberto Sorborelli, "Corps et Artivisme" by Sarah Trouche, Paris
- 2018: Effraction with Evelyne le Pollotec, performance intervention – sculpture "Parure" by d'Axel Rogier-Waeselynck, CRR 93, Paris
- 2018: The Fop with Jack Shamblin, Mia Kunter productions, Dixon Place, New York
- 2017: PN6 La Porte Noir, photography Nathalie Tiennot, Paris
- 2015: UnNamed with João Martinho Moura, GUELRA, GNRation and ARTE TOTAL residency, Braga
- 2014: L'Uomo performance/photography Iris Brosch, OPEN17, Venice
- 2013: Stars on the Stairs with Lidia Martinez/ Lieux Publics, Marseille European capital of cultural, Marseille
- 2013: Body Vectors –Video Mapping José BUDHA, Semaine des cultures étrangères, Paris
- 2007: 21 of April, photography Oswaldo Ruiz / Œuvre: Mitcham, London
- 2006: Behind the scenes of the Museum: A Performance Master Arts with the 'Seven Sisters Group', TATE Modern Museum, London
- 2005: The Dance, Fine Arts/Nudes with Eva Mueller, New York
- 2003: The Yellow Sound
- 2003: Phobias in Polyphony, Robert Flynt, New York
- 2001: [Your] Numbered Days, free photograph by Robert Flynt, Dr. Cantz'sche Druckerei, New York
- 1997/1998: Partial Disclosures photography Robert Flynt, New York

Other collaborations: Bernardo Montet, Margarida Bettencourt & Carlos Zingaro, Cristina Benedita & Carlos Zingaro, Laurent Simões, Manuel Granja, Helder Luis, André Guedes, Luciana Fina, Filipe Lopes/ PlayBleu.

Producers: Mark Deputter – Dances in the City Festival/ Alkantara Festival. Gil Mendo – Dance Forum. Rita Castro Neves. Genoveva Oliveira, Ana David – Musée m|i|mo. Graça Passos – CENTA. Sofia Neuparth – CEM Ghislaine Boddington – Butterfly Effect Network. Sue Gollifer – Brighton University. Cristina Mendanha – Arte Total/ Salvo Conduto and GUELRA with GNRation.

Photography: Bill Jacbson, Eric Rhein, Christophe Apatie.
