= João Amorim =

João Amorim may refer to:

- João Amorim (footballer, born 1991), Portuguese football defender
- João Amorim (footballer, born February 1992), Portuguese football midfielder
- João Amorim (footballer, born July 1992), Portuguese football defender
