= Gollifer =

Gollifer is a surname. Notable people with the surname include:

- Ann Gollifer (born 1960), British-Guyanese artist
- Sue Gollifer (born 1944), British printmaker and digital artist
