= Dead Eagle Owl =

1881 painting by Édouard Manet

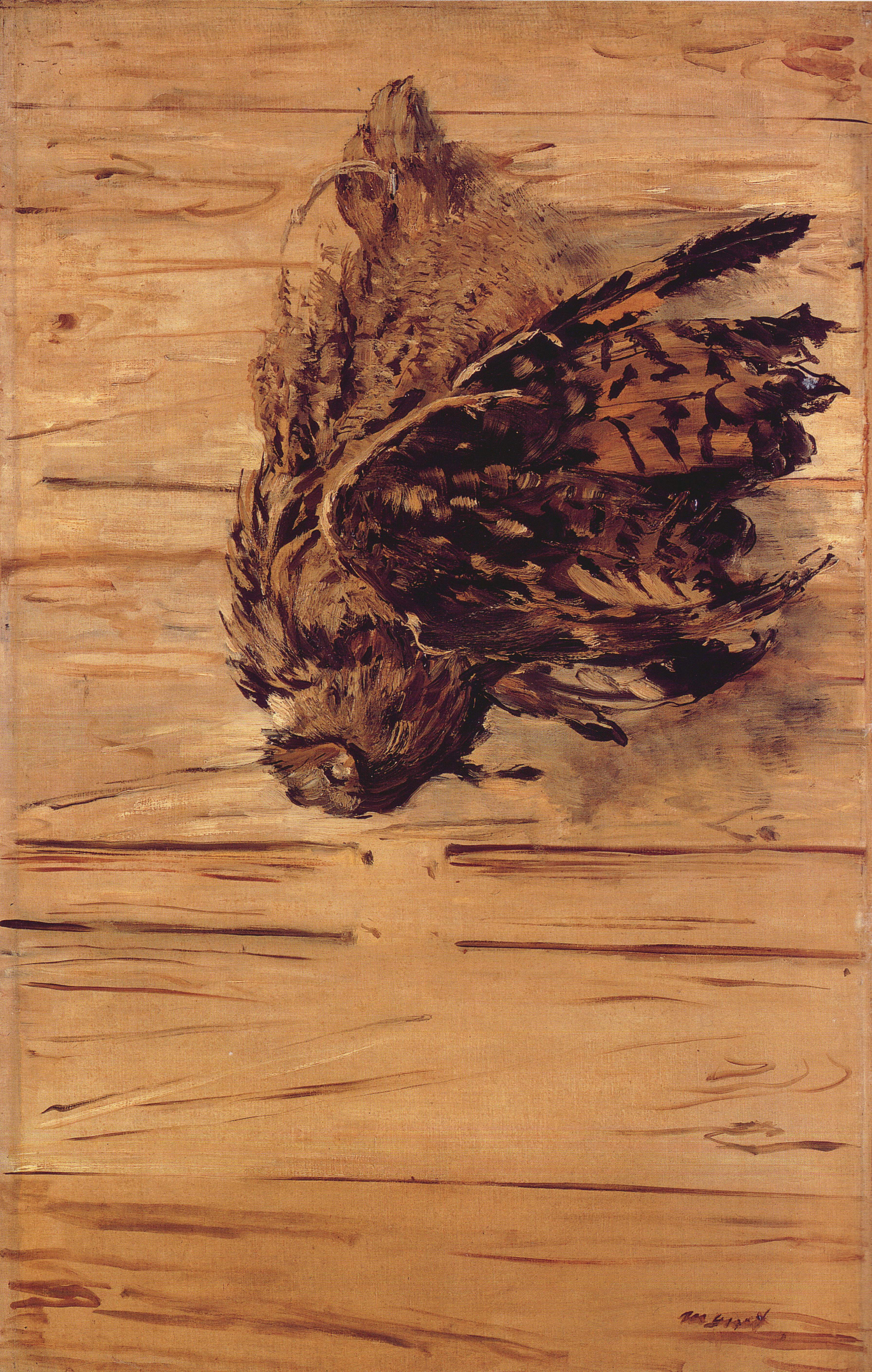
- Artist: Édouard Manet
- Year: 1881
- Medium: Oil on canvas
- Dimensions: 97 cm × 64 cm (38 in × 25 in)
- Location: Foundation E.G. Buhrle, Zurich

Dead Eagle Owl (French: Le Grand-duc) is an 1881 oil-on-canvas painting by Édouard Manet. One of the very few hunting still lifes in Manet's oeuvre, it depicts a dead Eurasian eagle-owl hanging upside down on a board as a hunting trophy. Dead Eagle Owl is one of a series of comparable still lifes that Manet painted in the same year in Versailles, during his recuperation from a serious illness. There are precedents for this morbid work in French still-life painting of the 18th century and Dutch still-life painting of the 17th century (i.e. Chardin and Weenix). The painting is in the collection of the Foundation E.G. Bührle in Zürich.

== Description ==
The subject of the 97 × 64 cm painting is an eagle owl hanging upside down on a wooden wall. A nail can be seen between the dead animal's feet, on which the knotted ends of a small rope are attached. This rope was probably used to tie the legs together and hang the animal on a nail. The hanging hunting trophy is turned to the left so that the viewer sees almost exclusively the right side of the animal. Only the right eye of the owl is visible and the right wing largely covers the left. Although Manet's depiction of the hunting trophy in this painting is "extremely picturesque-«impressionistic»", he clearly shows the different feathering of the individual parts of the body. The feathering of the head, the trunk, the legs and the wings are distinguished from each other by their shape, colour, pattern and brushstrokes.

The dead bird is not positioned exactly in the center of the picture, but occupies the top three-fifths of the picture. The bottom two-fifths of the image are reserved for the exclusive depiction of the wood grain. To the left of the bird, the grain of the wooden wall can also be clearly seen, while the area to the right of the body is partially covered by the animal's wings and behind it a kind of shadow effect is painted. A light source beyond the upper left edge of the picture can be assumed from this indicated shadow. Both the positioning of the eagle owl in the upper part of the picture and the vertical format of the painting reinforce the impression that the animal is hanging up. Due to the lack of any spatial surroundings, the picture can be assigned to the trompe-l'oeil painting that has been popular with still lifes since Jacopo de' Barbari. The signature 'Manet' is in the lower right corner of the picture.

The painter used brown tones and black almost exclusively in the painting for the representation of the animal as well as for that of the wood. While the owl is mainly created in short brush strokes and dabs of color, the horizontal wooden boards are rendered by an elongated brushwork whose wave-like movement underlines the wood grain. Manet's lively painting style stands in contrast to the subject of a dead animal. The art historian Ina Conzen describes Manet's style of painting as follows:

"As a modern variant of a hunting still life, the motif appears ... sober and matter-of-fact, devoid of any rhetoric. As a painting, the sensuous exploitation of the material qualities of the things – the feathery, violent characterization of the oppressed creature and the accentuated grain of the plank wall – have a direct, eloquent effect.”

== See also ==
- List of paintings by Édouard Manet
- The foundation's Catalogue entry
- 1881 in art
