= 1968 in fine arts of the Soviet Union =

The year 1968 was marked by many events that left an imprint on the history of Soviet and Russian Fine Arts.

== Events ==
- Exhibition of works by Alexander Samokhvalov was opened in the Leningrad House of writers.
- The Third convention of artists of the USSR passed in Moscow.

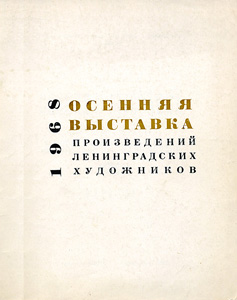
Exhibition Catalog

- All-Union Fine Art Exhibition named «On the guard of Motherland» was opened in the Central Exhibition Hall in Moscow. The participants were Mikhail Avilov, Isaak Brodsky, Vasily Golubev, Mitrofan Grekov, Aleksandr Deyneka, Alexei Eremin, Vecheslav Zagonek, Boris Korneev, Yaroslav Krestovsky, Oleg Lomakin, Evgeny Maltsev, Evsey Moiseenko, Mikhail Natarevich, Dmitry Oboznenko, Ivan Savenko, Victor Teterin, Mikhail Trufanov, Vitaly Tulenev, Boris Ugarov, and other important soviet artists.
- The Second convention of artists of the Russian Federation passed in Moscow.
- By the President of the Academy of Arts of the USSR was elected sculptor Nikolai Tomsky. Headed Academy of arts of the USSR up to 1983 year.
- The Autumn Exhibition of work by Leningrad artists was opened in the Leningrad Union of Artists. The participants were Piotr Alberti, Vsevolod Bazhenov, Sergei Frolov, Nikolai Galakhov, Tatiana Gorb, Vladimir Gorb, Mikhail Kaneev, Mikhail Kozell, Engels Kozlov, Elena Kostenko, Nikolai Kostrov, Anna Kostrova, Gevork Kotiantz, Vladimir Krantz, Ivan Lavsky, Dmitry Maevsky, Gavriil Malish, Nikolai Mukho, Mikhail Natarevich, Sergei Osipov, Vladimir Ovchinnikov, Lev Orekhov, Victor Otiev, Maria Rudnitskaya, Ivan Savenko, Vladimir Sakson, Alexander Semionov, Arseny Semionov, Boris Shamanov, Alexander Shmidt, Elena Skuin, Alexander Stolbov, German Tatarinov, Mikhail Trufanov, Yuri Tulin, Ivan Varichev, Anatoli Vasiliev, Rostislav Vovkushevsky, Lazar Yazgur, Vecheslav Zagonek, Sergei Zakharov, Ruben Zakharian, and other important Leningrad artists.
- Solo Exhibition of works by Ivan Stepashkin was opened in the Museum of the Vera Mukhina Institute in Leningrad.
- Solo Exhibition of works by Samuil Nevelshtein was opened in the Leningrad Union of Artists.

== Deaths ==
- January 19 — Vladimir Serov (Russian: Серов Владимир Александрович), Russian soviet painter, art educator, and graphic artists, People's Artist of the USSR (born 1910).
- February 21 — Pavel Kuznetsov (Russian: Кузнецов Павел Варфоломеевич), Russian soviet painter, Honored Arts Worker of the RSFSR (b. 1878).
- September 6 — Nikolay Akimov (Russian: Акимов Николай Павлович), Russian soviet painter and theatre artist, People's Artist of the USSR (b. 1901).
- October 12 — Nikolai Rutkovsky (Russian: Рутковский Николай Христофорович), Russian soviet painter and theatre artist (b. 1892).
- 26 ноября — Victor Ivanov (Russian: Иванов Виктор Семёнович), Russian soviet graphic artist, Honored Arts Worker of the RSFSR, Stalin Prize winner (b. 1909).
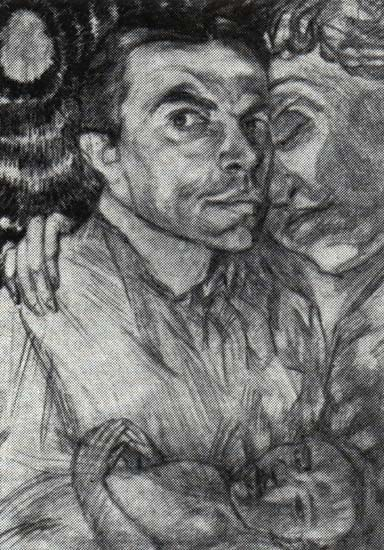
Pavel Kuznetsov — selfportrait, 1906

== See also ==
- List of Russian artists
- List of painters of Leningrad Union of Artists
- Saint Petersburg Union of Artists
- Russian culture

== Sources ==
- «На страже Родины». Всесоюзная художественная выставка. Каталог. М., Советский художник, 1969.
- Осенняя выставка произведений ленинградских художников. Каталог. Л., Художник РСФСР, 1971.
- Выставка произведений И. П. Степашкина. 1882—1960. Каталог. Л., Художник РСФСР, 1968.
- Невельштейн Самуил Григорьевич. Образы юности. Каталог выставки. Л., Художник РСФСР, 1968.
- Artists of Peoples of the USSR. Biography Dictionary. Vol. 1. Moscow, Iskusstvo, 1970.
- Artists of Peoples of the USSR. Biography Dictionary. Vol. 2. Moscow, Iskusstvo, 1972.
- Directory of Members of Union of Artists of USSR. Volume 1,2. Moscow, Soviet Artist Edition, 1979.
- Directory of Members of the Leningrad branch of the Union of Artists of Russian Federation. Leningrad, Khudozhnik RSFSR, 1980.
- Artists of Peoples of the USSR. Biography Dictionary. Vol. 4 Book 1. Moscow, Iskusstvo, 1983.
- Directory of Members of the Leningrad branch of the Union of Artists of Russian Federation. - Leningrad: Khudozhnik RSFSR, 1987.
- Artists of peoples of the USSR. Biography Dictionary. Vol. 4 Book 2. - Saint Petersburg: Academic project humanitarian agency, 1995.
- Link of Times: 1932 - 1997. Artists - Members of Saint Petersburg Union of Artists of Russia. Exhibition catalogue. - Saint Petersburg: Manezh Central Exhibition Hall, 1997.
- Matthew C. Bown. Dictionary of 20th Century Russian and Soviet Painters 1900-1980s. - London: Izomar, 1998.
- Vern G. Swanson. Soviet Impressionism. - Woodbridge, England: Antique Collectors' Club, 2001.
- Время перемен. Искусство 1960—1985 в Советском Союзе. СПб., Государственный Русский музей, 2006.
- Sergei V. Ivanov. Unknown Socialist Realism. The Leningrad School. - Saint-Petersburg: NP-Print Edition, 2007. - ISBN 5-901724-21-6, ISBN 978-5-901724-21-7.
- Anniversary Directory graduates of Saint Petersburg State Academic Institute of Painting, Sculpture, and Architecture named after Ilya Repin, Russian Academy of Arts. 1915 - 2005. - Saint Petersburg: Pervotsvet Publishing House, 2007.
