= The Two Friends (painting) =

Painting by James Tissot

- Artist: James Tissot
- Year: 1881
- Type: Oil on canvas, genre painting
- Dimensions: 116 cm × 53 cm (46 in × 21 in)
- Location: Rhode Island School of Design Museum, Providence

The Two Friends (French: Les Deux Amis) is an 1881 oil painting by the French artist James Tissot. It depicts the farewell between two male friends shaking hands as they part, one of them aboard a ship about to make a Transatlantic crossing. The man who clings to the rigging resembles William Eglinton, who travelled to the United States that year. Tissot's lover and muse Kathleen Newton posed for the two women just to the left of the men.

Tissot relocated to Britain following the Franco-Prussian War and enjoyed success with his scenes of everyday life. The two crates marked Alabama and New York may refer to the booming trade between Britain and America following the American Civil War. The painting is now in the Rhode Island School of Design Museum in Providence. Tissot also produced an etching based on the image.

== Bibliography ==
- Ash, Russell. James Tissot. Pavilion, 1992.
- Marshall, Nancy Rose & Warner, Malcolm. James Tissot: Victorian Life, Modern Love. Yale University Press, 1999.
- Slimmon, Ann H & Singsen, Judith A. (ed.) European Painting and Sculpture, Ca. 1770-1937, in the Museum of Art, Rhode Island School of Design. University of Pennsylvania Press, 1991.
- Wentworth, Michael. James Tissot. Clarendon Press, 1984.
