= Arnoldus Andries des Tombe =

Arnoldus Andries des Tombe (6 February 1816, Vught - 16 December 1902, The Hague) was a Dutch army officer, genealogist and art collector, notable for his purchase of the Vermeer painting Girl with a Pearl Earring – on the advice of Victor de Stuers, who for years tried to prevent Vermeer's rare works from being sold to parties abroad. Des Tombe purchased the work at an auction in The Hague in 1881, for only two guilders and thirty cents. He had no heirs and donated this and other paintings to the Mauritshuis in 1902.
