= Sika Foyer =

Togolese-American artist (born 1968)

Sika Foyer (born 1968) is a Togolese American mixed media and conceptual visual artist and curator living and working in New York City. In 2017 she curated the exhibition Affirmative Art at Nagenda International Academy of Art and Design (NIAAD) at Makerere University in Namulanda, Entebbe, Uganda. In 2021 she received her Master of Fine Arts from Lesley University in Cambridge, Massachusetts.

Many of her recent works center upon the concept of wrapping. in 2021 Her work was the subject of a solo exhibition Mara River Crossing at the Soloway Gallery in Brooklyn, New York. The same year her work was shown in a group exhibition of seven contemporary black artists Legacy and Rupture at the City Gallery in New Haven, Connecticut.

In September of 2022 Foyer's work was included in the group exhibition African Women Artists: Exploring the Way Forward at the Calabar gallery in New York City.

Starting in late August of 2023 Foyer through the auspices of the Lower Manhattan Cultural Council is one of the artists-in-residence at the Arts Center on Governor's Island in New York City. Also in 2023 Foyer was granted an artist residency at the Mystic Seaport Museum.
