= Waves Breaking =

1881 painting by Claude Monet

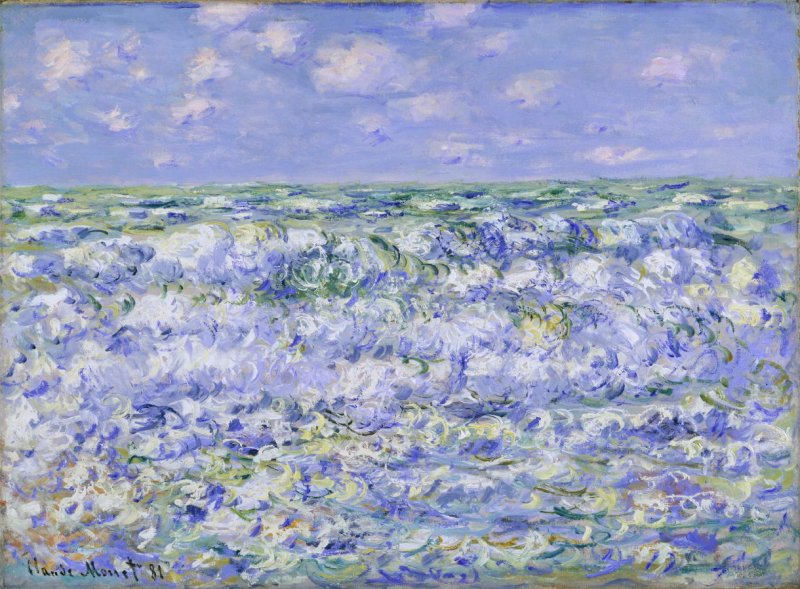
- Artist: Claude Monet
- Year: 1881
- Medium: Oil on canvas
- Location: Legion of Honor, San Francisco

Waves Breaking is an 1881 canvas by the French Impressionist painter Claude Monet (1840–1926). It was painted on the coast of Normandy and follows the example of Gustave Courbet's marine paintings as in having been executed with the painter having faced out toward the sea. The work is held at Legion of Honor which is part of the Fine Arts Museums of San Francisco. It is considered a work of Marine art.

== See also ==
- List of paintings by Claude Monet
