= Patrik Andiné =

Swedish artist

Patrik Andiné (born 11 July 1968 in Gothenburg) is a Swedish painter. He was educated at the Royal Institute of Art in 1990–1995. He has become known for his colourful oil paintings with mysterious and dreamlike scenes. He frequently aims to paint archetypical subjects drawn from the subconscious. An important influence is fairy tales and their often serious undertones. A recurring subject is scouting, which Andiné regards as a positive symbol for belonging, as well as something slightly uncomfortable, as the uniforms remind him of the Hitler Youth.

Although sometimes labeled as such, he does not consider himself a surrealist.

== Selected solo exhibitions ==
- 1992: Galleri Maximus, Borås, Sweden
- 1994: Galleri Mejan, Sockholm, Sweden
- 1997: Galleri Fahl, Stockholm, Sweden
- 1997: Galleri 1, Gothenburg, Sweden
- 1997: Swedish Art Edition, Gothenburg, Sweden
- 1997: Galleri Mittbrodt´s, Borgholm, Sweden
- 1999: Galleri Wallner, Malmö, Sweden
- 2000: Galleri Fahl, Stockholm, Sweden
- 2001: Borås konstmuseum, Sweden
- 2001: Galleri 1, Gothenburg, Sweden
- 2003: Galleri Fahl, Stockholm, Sweden
- 2003: Kabusa Konsthall, Sweden
- 2004: Halmstad konstklubb, Sweden
- 2005: Galleri 1, Gothenburg, Sweden
- 2006: Knäpper + Baumgarten, Stockholm, Sweden
- 2007: Galleri Mittbrodt´s, Borgholm, Sweden
- 2008: Angelika Knäpper Gallery, Stockholm, Sweden
- 2008: Galleri 1, Gothenburg, Sweden
- 2009: Alingsås konsthall, Sweden
- 2011: Galleri 1, Gothenburg, Sweden
- 2012: Angelika Knäpper Gallery, Stockholm, Sweden
- 2012: Lars Lerins Sandgrund, Karlstad, Sweden
- 2015: Lars Bohman Gallery, Stockholm, Sweden
