= Sue Gollifer =

British printmaker and digital artist

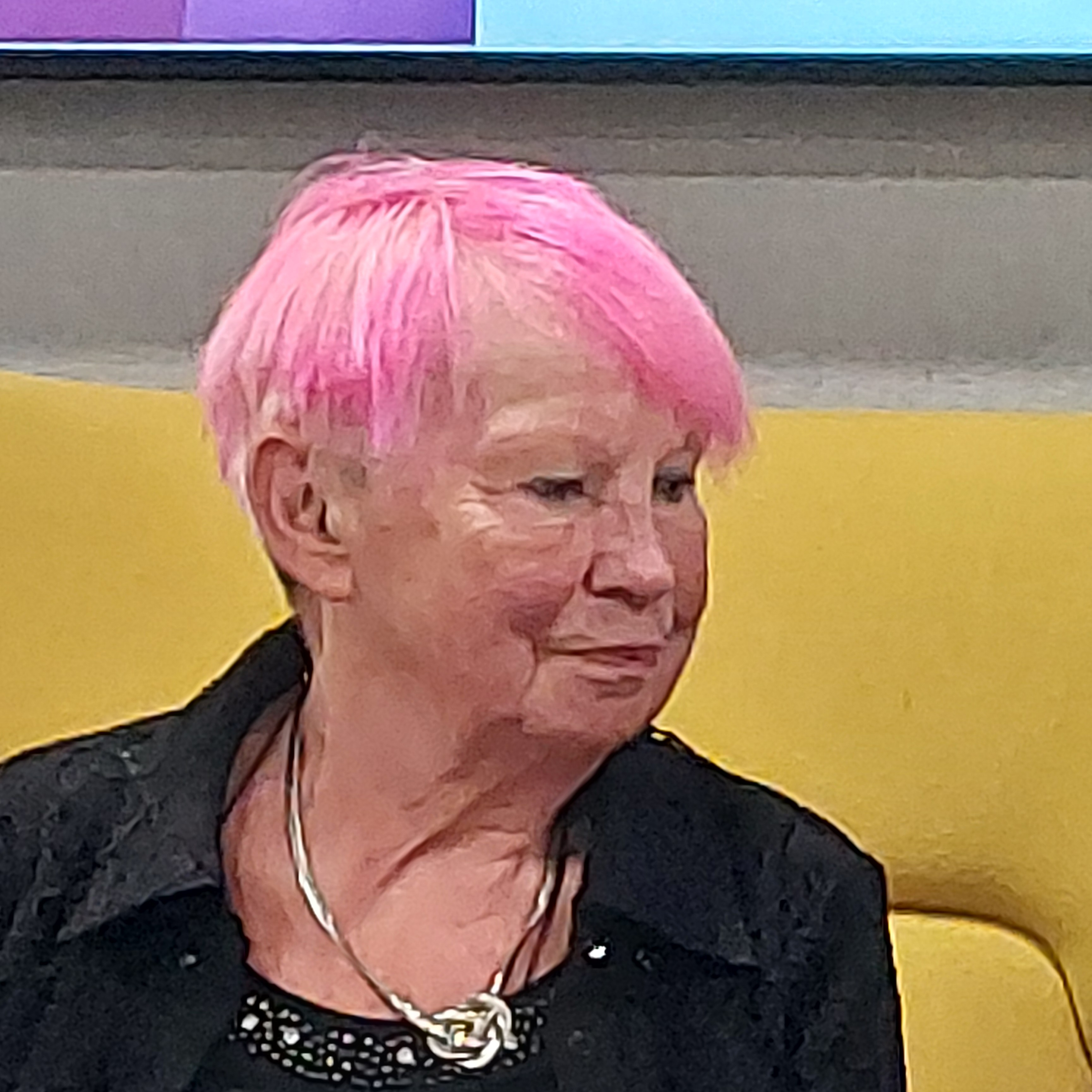
- Sue Gollifer at the opening of her retrospective exhibition at the BCS in central London, 2024
- Born: 1944 (age 81–82); United Kingdom
- Education: University of Brighton
- Employer: University of Brighton
- Known for: Digital art Silkscreen
- Awards: International Digital Media Arts Award; 2006

Sue Gollifer (born December 1944) is a British artist and academic. She uses silkscreen printing as well as digital techniques to produce her artworks. She is based in Brighton, southern England.

Gollifer received her master's degree in printmaking from the University of Brighton, United Kingdom, in 1969. Early in her career, she taught at the Hastings Art College and exhibited at the Serpentine Gallery in London. Later, Gollifer was a Principal Lecturer (later an Honorary Fellow) in Fine Art/Printmaking within the School of Arts and Communication in the Faculty of Arts and Architecture at the University of Brighton. She was the Course Leader for the PG Dip course in Digital Media Arts. Her research has been based on the impact of new technology on the practice of fine art.

Sue Gollifer is also a professional artist/printmaker, with regular exhibitions internationally, and her artworks are held in international public collections, including the British Council and the Victoria & Albert Museum. She was the curator of the first five United Kingdom international exhibitions of electronic prints (ArCade I, II, III, IV, and V during 1995 to 2007 – "Computers in Art and Design Education"). She was also the ACM SIGGRAPH Art Gallery Chair during 2004, in Los Angeles, United States. In 2006, Gollifer was awarded an International Digital Media Arts Award for her "exceptional services to the international new media community". She was an executive director of ISEA International from 2011 to 2021.

Gollifer is a member of the Printmakers Council. She has been an active member of the Computer Arts Society (CAS). In 2024–25, a retrospective exhibition of her work was held at the BCS London office, organised by CAS.
