= Sofia Neuparth =

Portuguese dancer, choreographer, researcher, and educator

- Born: 1962 (age 63–64); Lisbon, Portugal
- Occupations: Dancer, choreographer, researcher, educator
- Known for: Founder of c.e.m. – centro em movimento; influential figure in contemporary dance and somatic practices in Portugal

Sofia Neuparth (born 1962, Lisbon) is a Portuguese dancer, choreographer, researcher, and educator. She is recognized as a leading figure in contemporary dance in Portugal, known for her innovative work on movement, body awareness, and the intersection of artistic creation with education and community engagement.

== Career ==
Neuparth began her artistic path in the 1980s, shaping the field of contemporary dance and somatic research in Portugal. She is the founder and director of c.e.m. – centro em movimento, a unique Lisbon-based space for artistic research, education, and performance, which has become a reference point for contemporary dance, movement studies, and interdisciplinary collaboration.

Her work is characterized by a deep investigation into the body as an event in relationship—with itself, with others, and with the world. Neuparth’s approach emphasizes attentive exploration, somatic awareness, and the creative potential of everyday movement. She is known for developing practices rooted in the study of the embryonic journey, improvisation, and the poetic dimensions of the body.

== Choreographic and educational projects ==
Neuparth has created and directed numerous dance works, workshops, and educational programs. Some of her notable creations include:

- mmm-um poema físico (2005)
- Sopro (2017)
- Mulheres de papel (2024)

She is also the author and co-author of texts such as Práticas para ver o invisível e guardar segredo (2010), Movimento (2014), and Criação (2020, with Margarida Agostinho), which reflect her commitment to articulating the experiential and philosophical dimensions of movement.

Through c.e.m., Neuparth has mentored generations of artists and facilitated encounters between dancers, thinkers, and activists. Her work extends to programming, documentation, and political intervention in the arts, supporting the development of autonomous and critical artistic communities.
