= João Amorim (footballer, born 1991) =

Portuguese footballer

Personal information
- Full name: João Filipe Caldas Amorim
- Date of birth: 30 September 1991 (age 35)
- Place of birth: Lisbon, Portugal
- Height: 1.77 m (5 ft 9 1/2 in)
- Position: Right-back

Youth career
- 2003–2005: Chelas
- 2005–2010: Oriental

Senior career*
Years	Team	Apps	(Gls)
2010–2017	Oriental	120	(4)
2017–2018	Salmantino		
- * Club domestic league appearances and goals

João Filipe Caldas Amorim (born 30 September 1991) is a Portuguese former professional footballer who played as a right-back.

== Club career ==
Born in Lisbon, Amorim joined Clube Oriental de Lisboa's academy at the age of 14. He went on to spend seven seasons as a senior with the first team, five in the third division and two in the second.

Amorim played his first match in the second tier on 4 January 2015, featuring 90 minutes in a 2–1 away win against Leixões SC. He scored his first goal in the competition on 15 August of the same year, his header earning the hosts one point in the last minute to close the 4–4 home draw with Vitória de Guimarães B.

In July 2017, Amorim signed with Spanish Tercera División club CF Salmantino UDS alongside his compatriot Bruno Miranda.
