= John Munsterhjelm =

Finnish sculptor

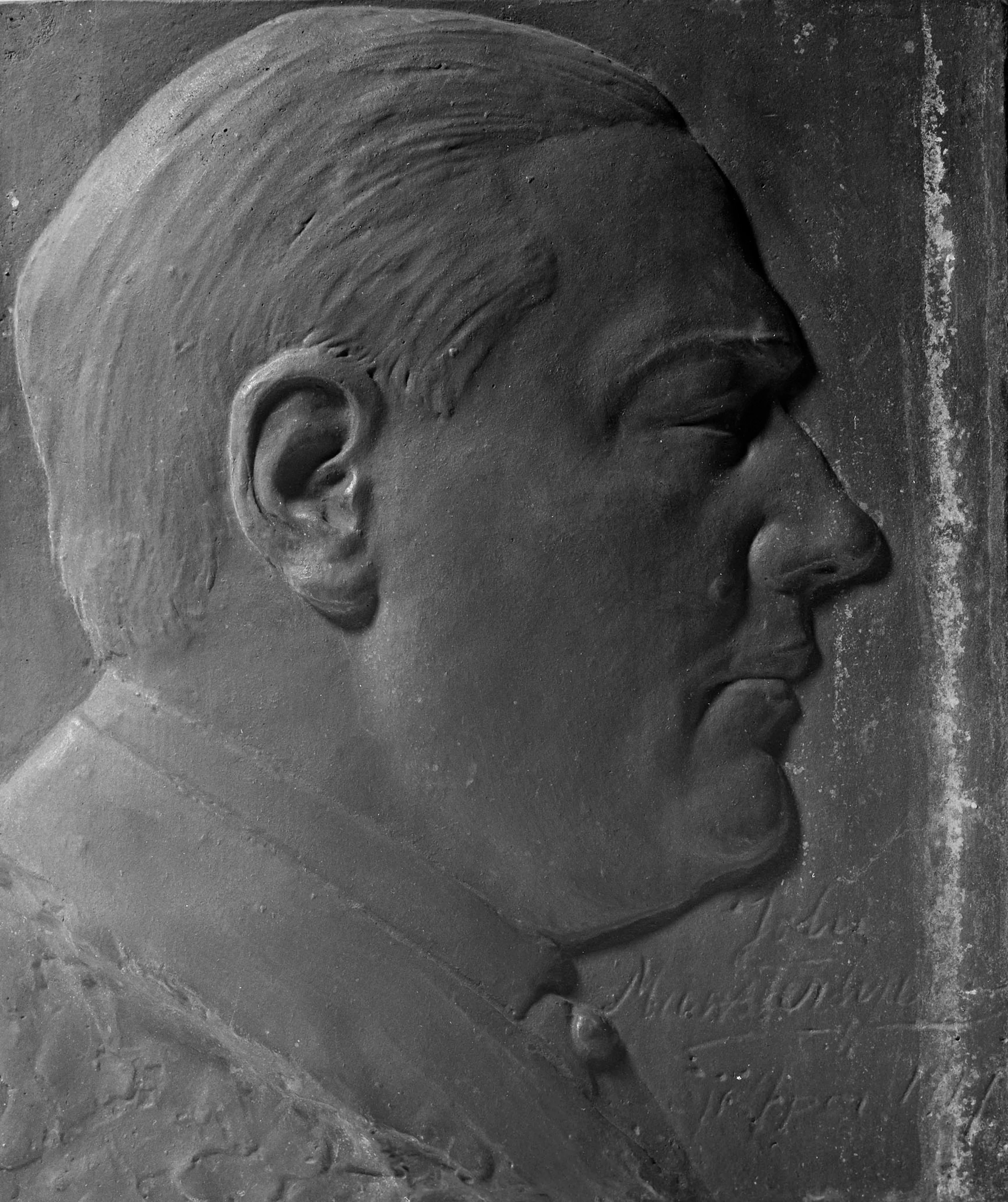
- Self-Portrait, 1917 sculpture in bronze
- Born: Johan Hjalmar Munsterhjelm; 11 December 1879; Tuulos, Grand Duchy of Finland
- Died: 16 August 1925 (aged 45); Helsinki, Finland
- Known for: Sculpting

Johan Hjalmar (John) Munsterhjelm (December 11, 1879 Tuulos – 16 August 1925 Helsinki) was a Finnish sculptor.

== Biography ==
He was born to painter Magnus Hjalmar Munsterhjelm and Olga Mathilda Tanninen in Tuulos. He first aimed to become an architect while studying at Helsinki Polytechnical Institute, but he became more interested in applied arts. He studied at a kunstgewerbeschule in Berlin 1902–1903. He went onto further study at the Royal School of Art in Berlin. He ended up living in Berlin until 1911 while also making study tours in Scandinavia, Belgium, France and Italy. In 1909 he married German Hedvig Schneider. The same year he sculpted a bust of Jean Sibelius. He made decorative figurines out of bronze and granite, sculpted a city hall facade in Vaasa (showing Charles IX and the double portrait of the national rulers, Pehr Evind Svinhufvud and Gustaf Mannerheim), a large number of portrait busts of prominent persons and medallions. He acted as the vice president of The Artists' Association of Finland from 1913 to 1915.

He died following complications from appendix surgery in 1925. Being German-influenced and slightly foreign to Finland's sculpting circles at the time, he never developed a substantial reputation in Finland.

== Works ==
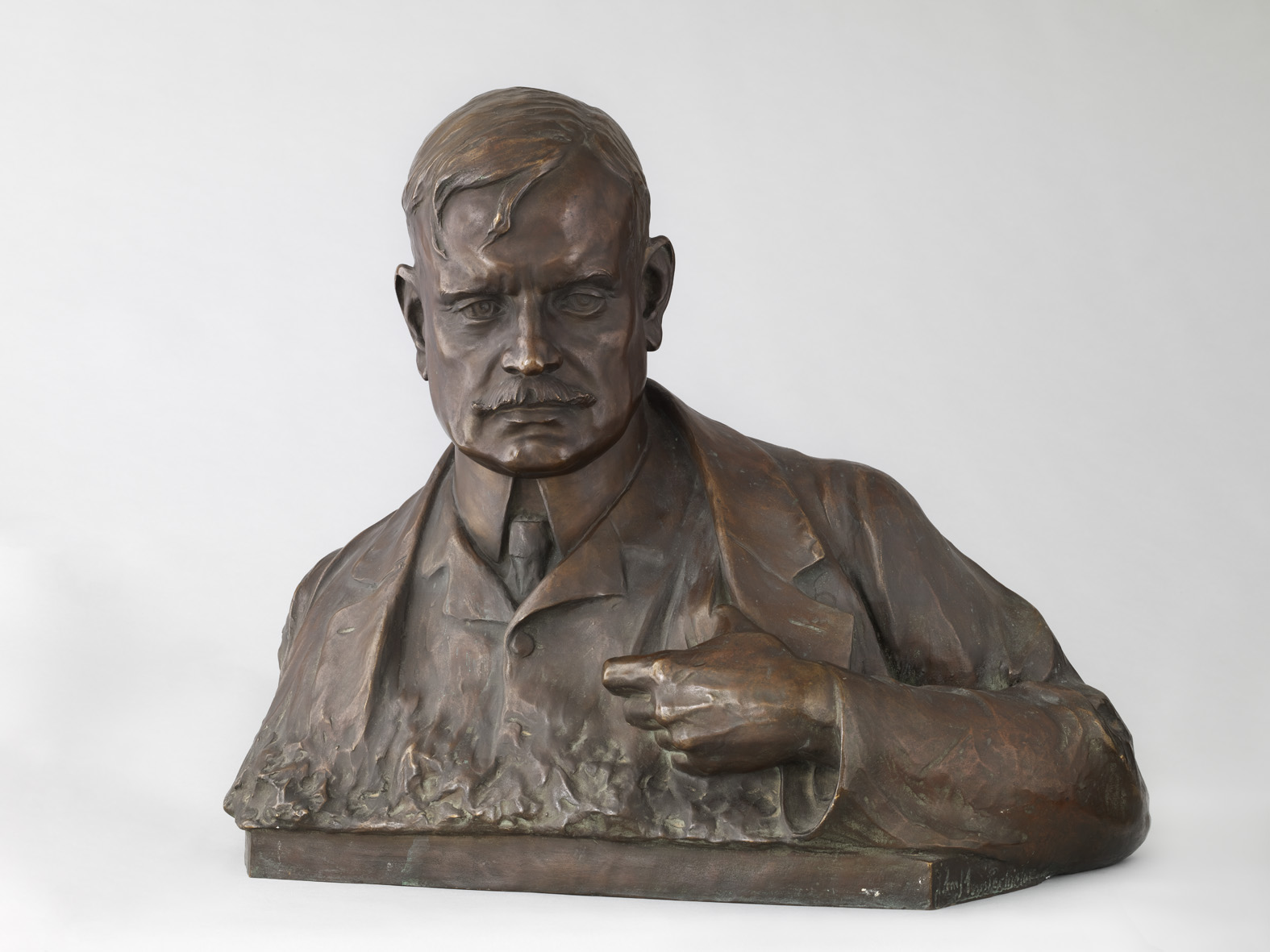
Portrait of Jean Sibelius, Bust, 1909

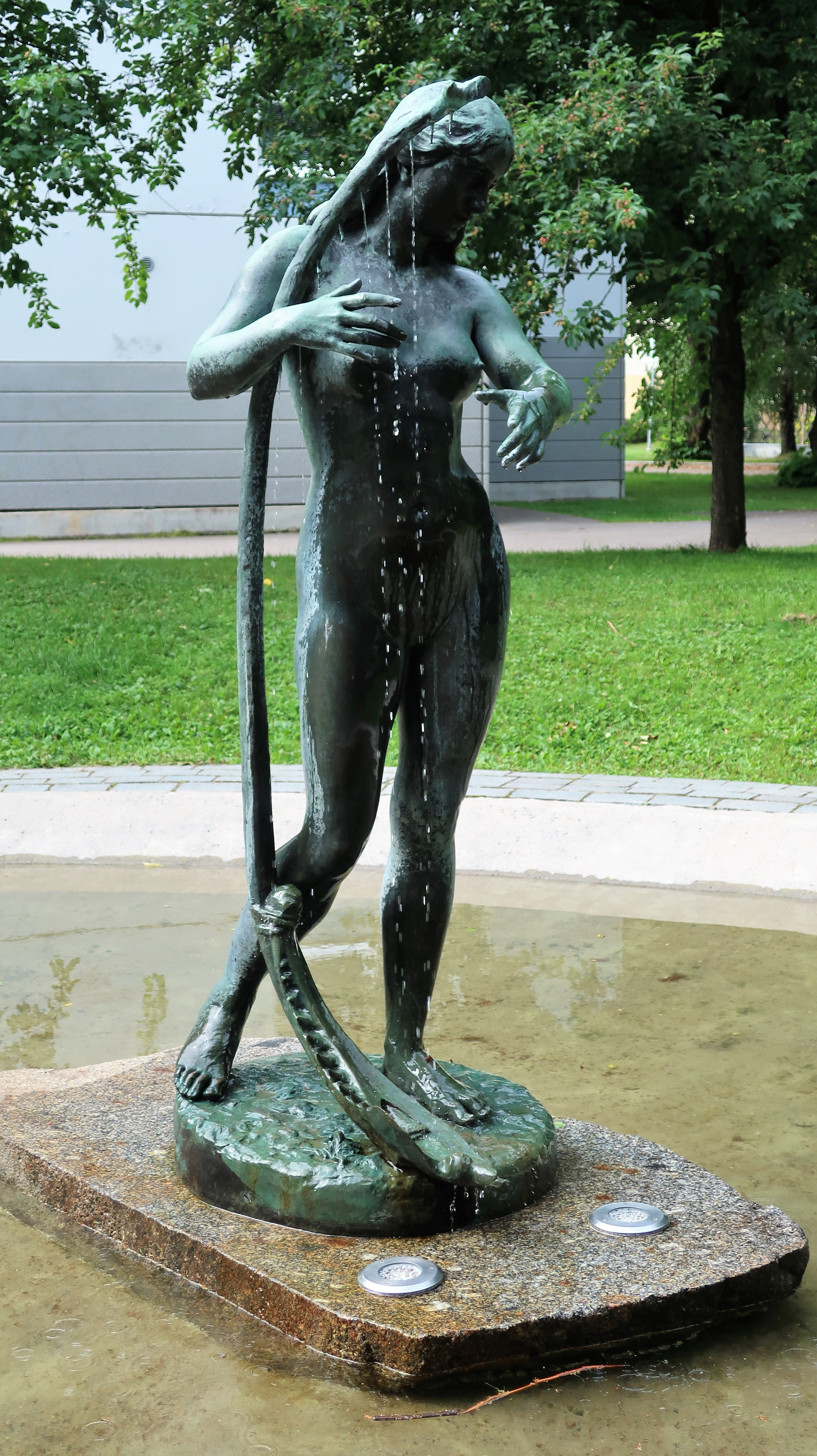
Lakes of Finland, allegorical portrayal of the waters of Finland, 1911

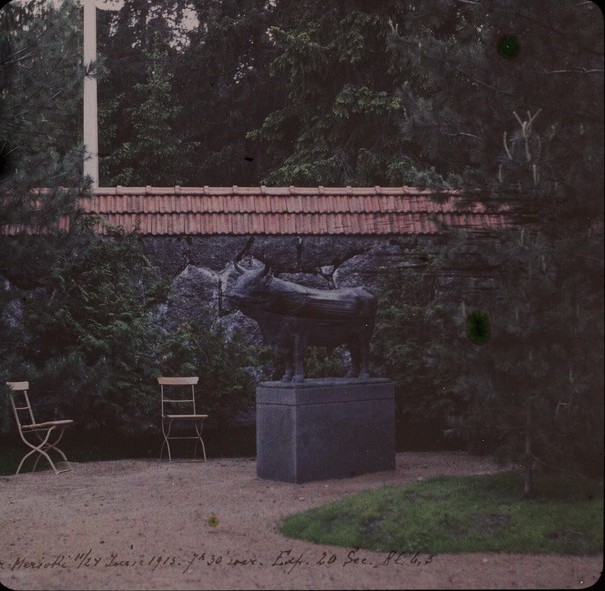
The Ox in Vyborg, 1915

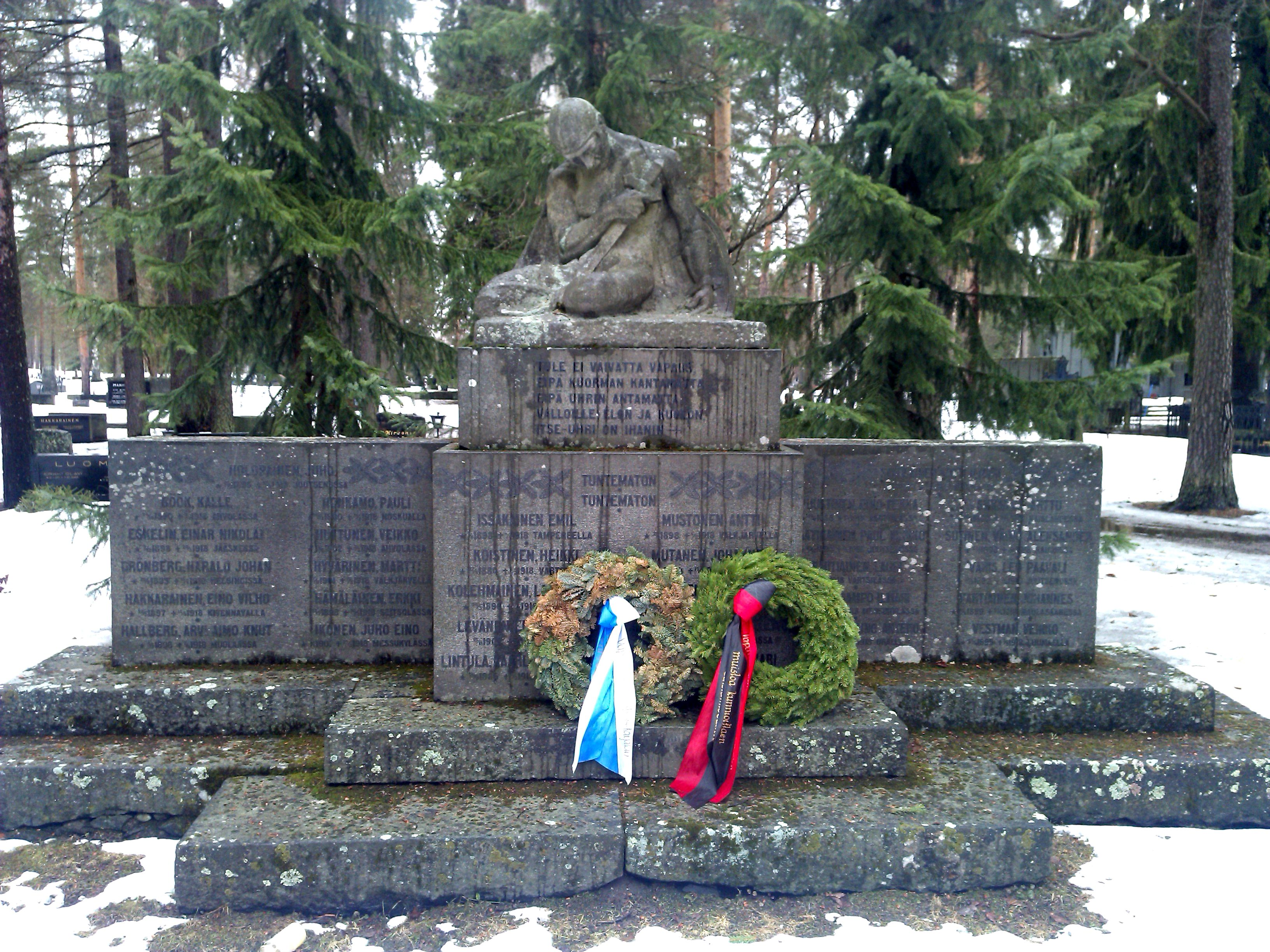
Memorial at Joensuu cemetery to those fallen in the Finnish Civil War, 1920

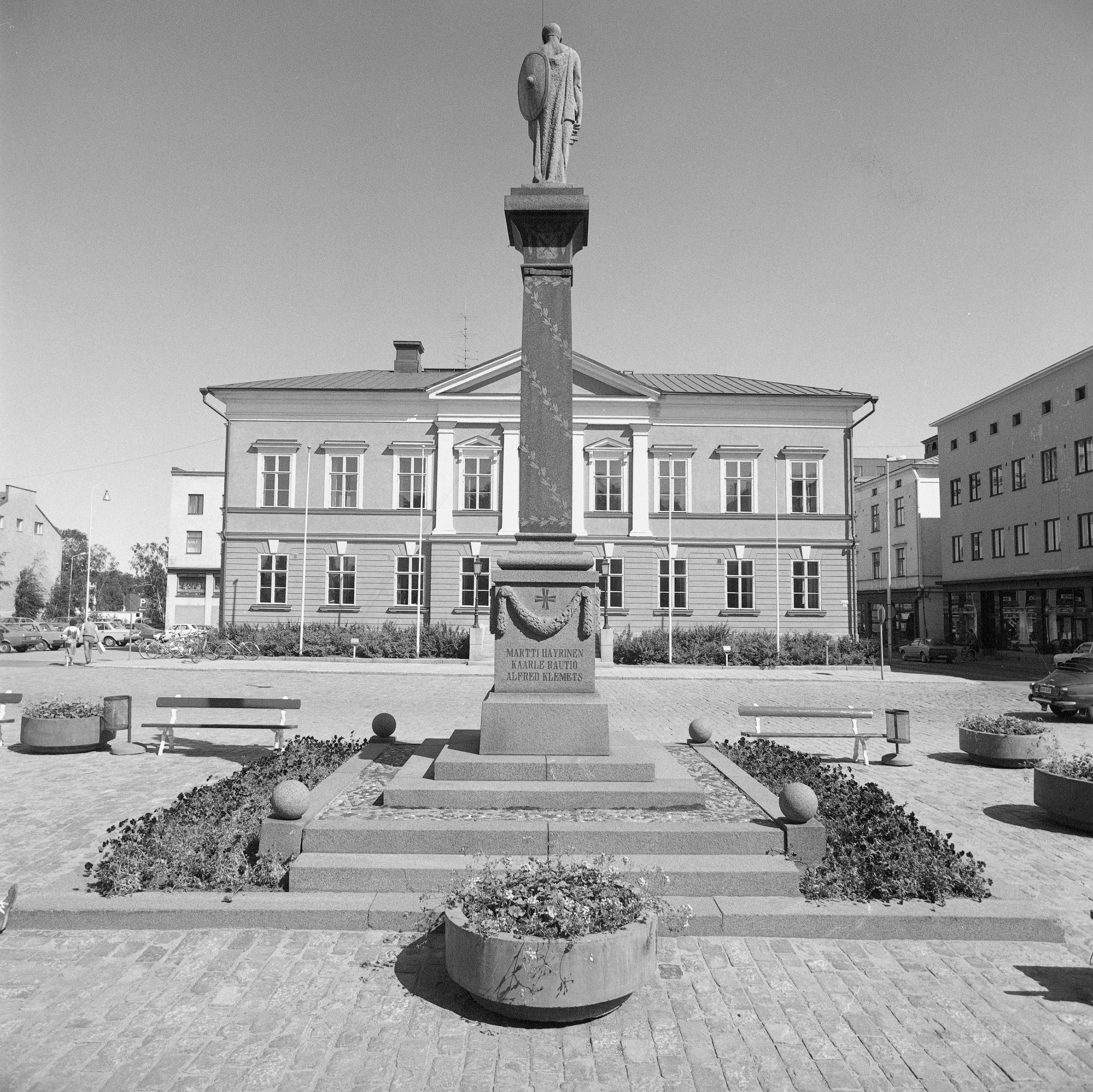
Vapaudenpatsas (Statue of Liberty) in Kokkola right across the town hall, 1920. Names of those who died in the Finnish Civil War are carved into the base. In his right hand he has a sword and on his left shoulder is a shield.

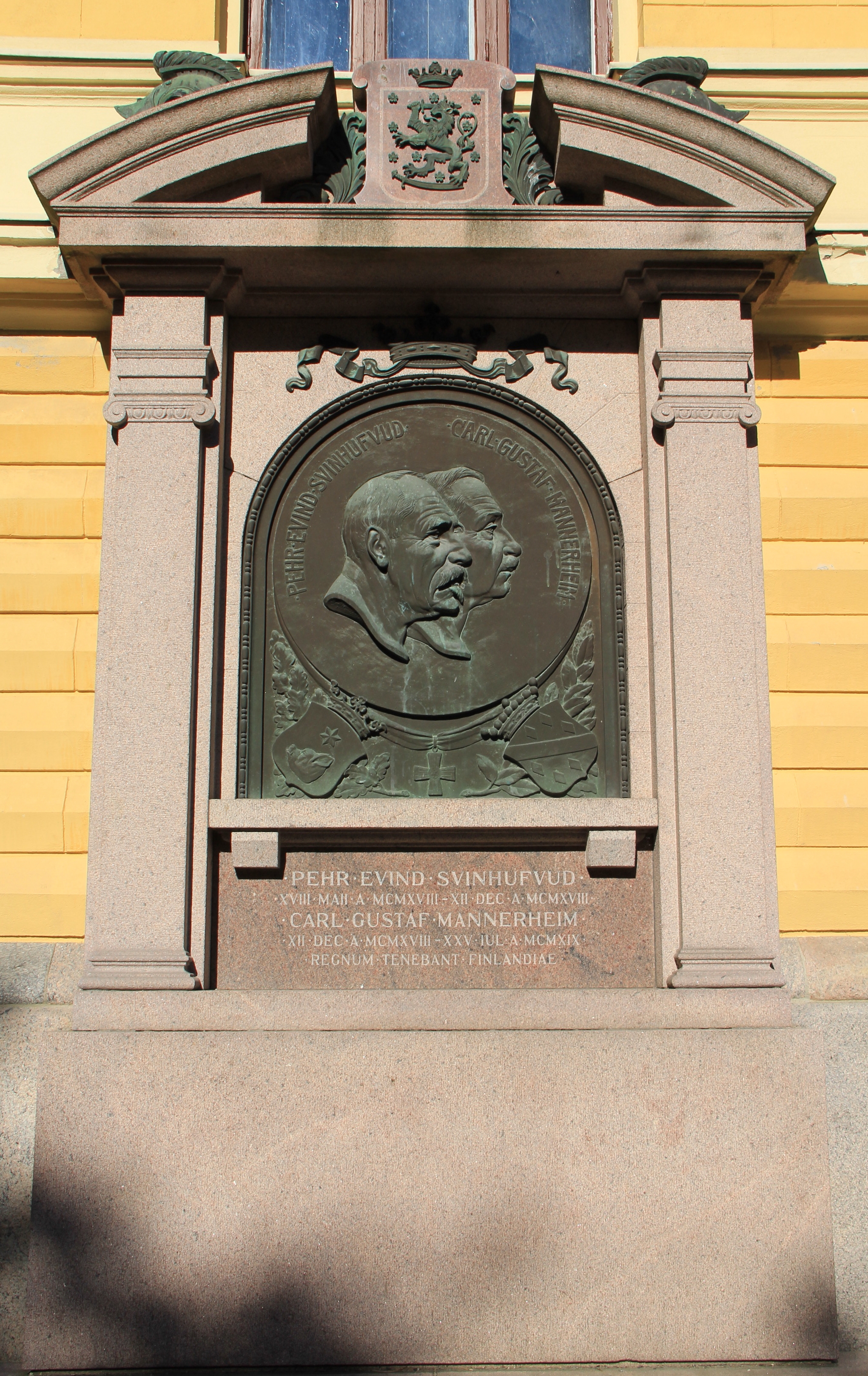
Relief of Svinhufvud and Mannerheim on the left side of the front facade of the Vaasa City Hall, 1924

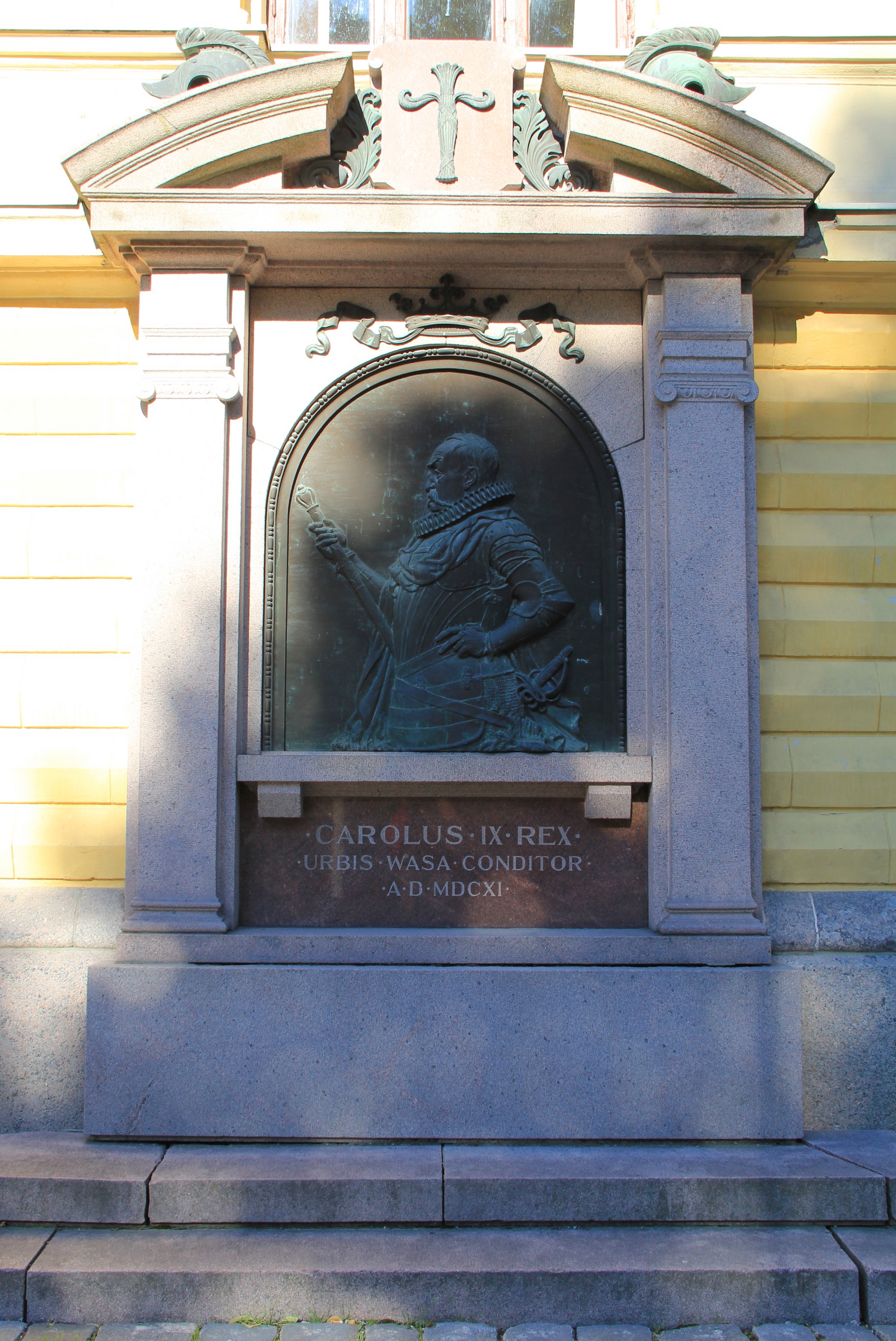
Relief of Charles IX on the right side, 1924
