= Hjalmar Munsterhjelm =

Finnish painter (1840–1905)

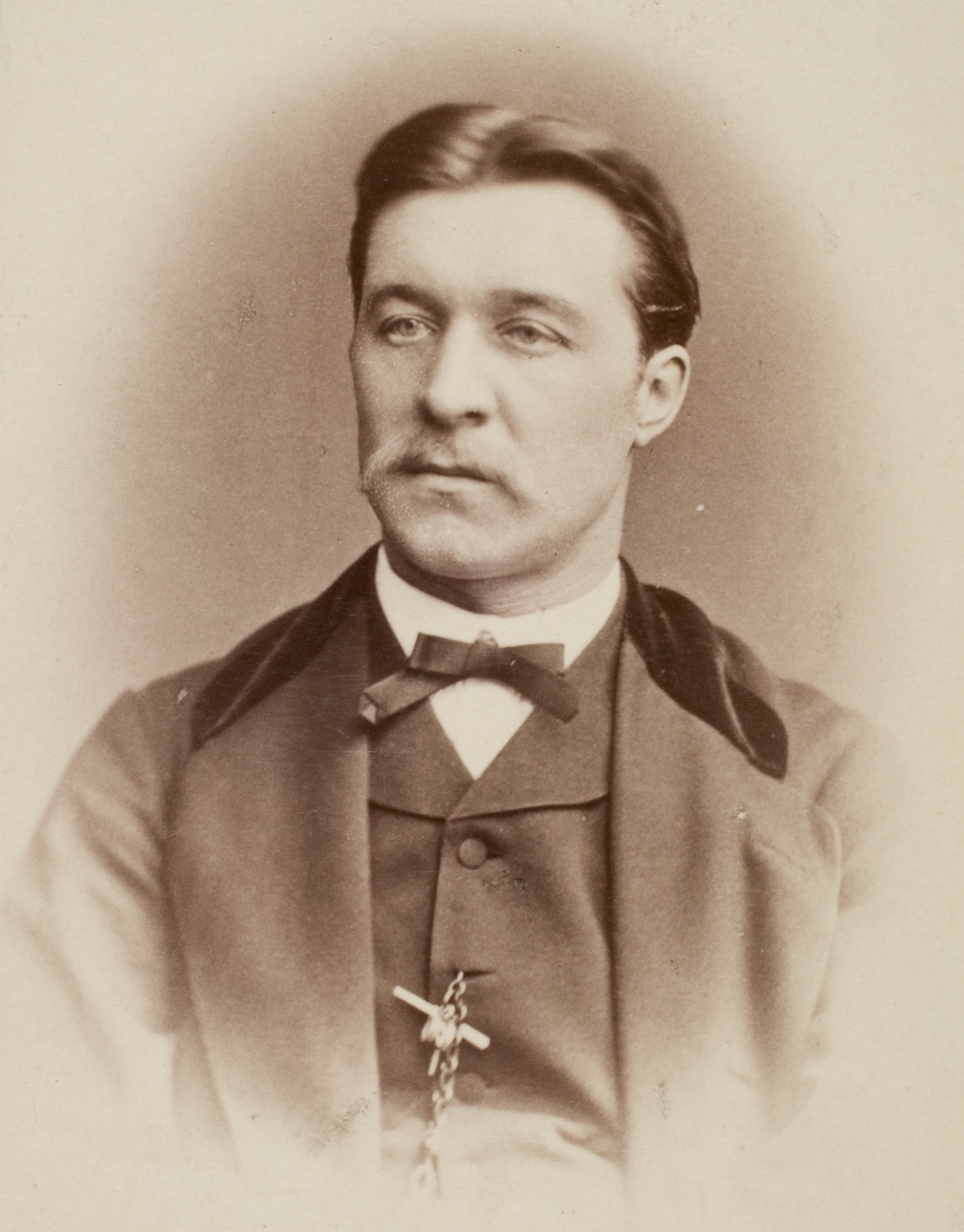
- Munsterhjelm in 1871–1878
- Born: 19 October 1840; Tuulos, Grand Duchy of Finland
- Died: 2 April 1905 (aged 64); Helsinki, Grand Duchy of Finland
- Education: Member Academy of Arts (1874)
- Known for: Painting
- Style: Classicism
- Movement: Realism

Magnus Hjalmar Munsterhjelm (19 October 1840 – 2 April 1905) was a Finnish landscape painter.

== Biography ==
Munsterhjelm was born at Toivoniemi Manor of Tuulos, Finland. He was the son of Gustaf Riggert Munsterhjelm (1806-1872) and his wife and Mathilda Charlotta Eleonora von Essen (1818-1895). His father first sent him to the Turku Maritime School. In the early 1860s, he studied art at Düsseldorf with Werner Holmberg (1830-1860) and Oswald Achenbach (1827-1905) and at Karlsruhe under Hans Gude.

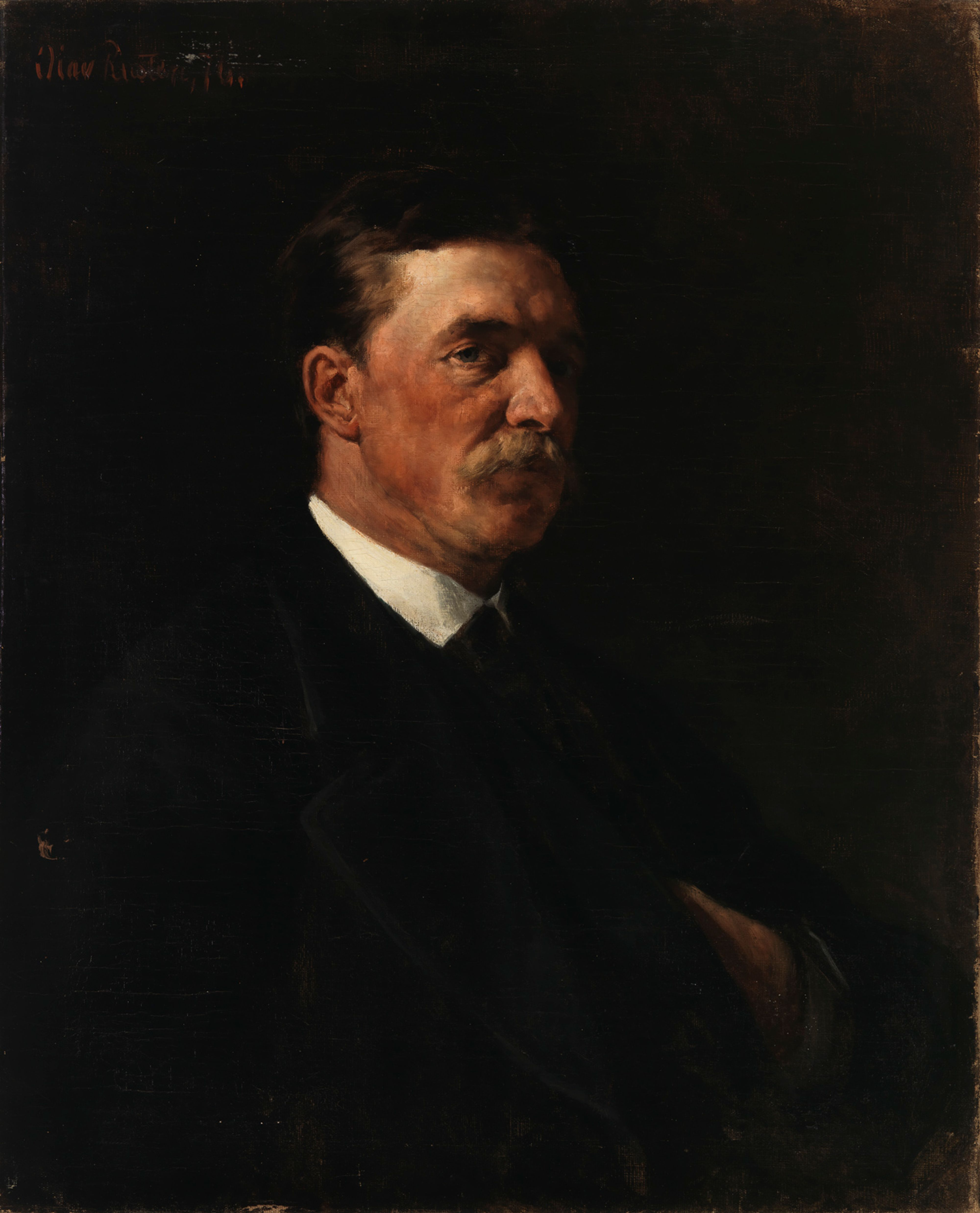
Portrait by Olav Rusti, 1876

His painted landscapes were influenced by the romanticism of the Düsseldorf school, often featuring nature as a mood rather than a realistic subject. His landscape "October Evening After the First Snowfall" (1883) was purchased by Alexander III in 1885; the painting is now in the Ateneum in Helsinki. Two of his works, "The Evening, in Finland" and "The Night" were displayed at the 1878 Paris Exposition. His work "Evening of the First Spring" was also on display at the 1900 Paris Exposition.

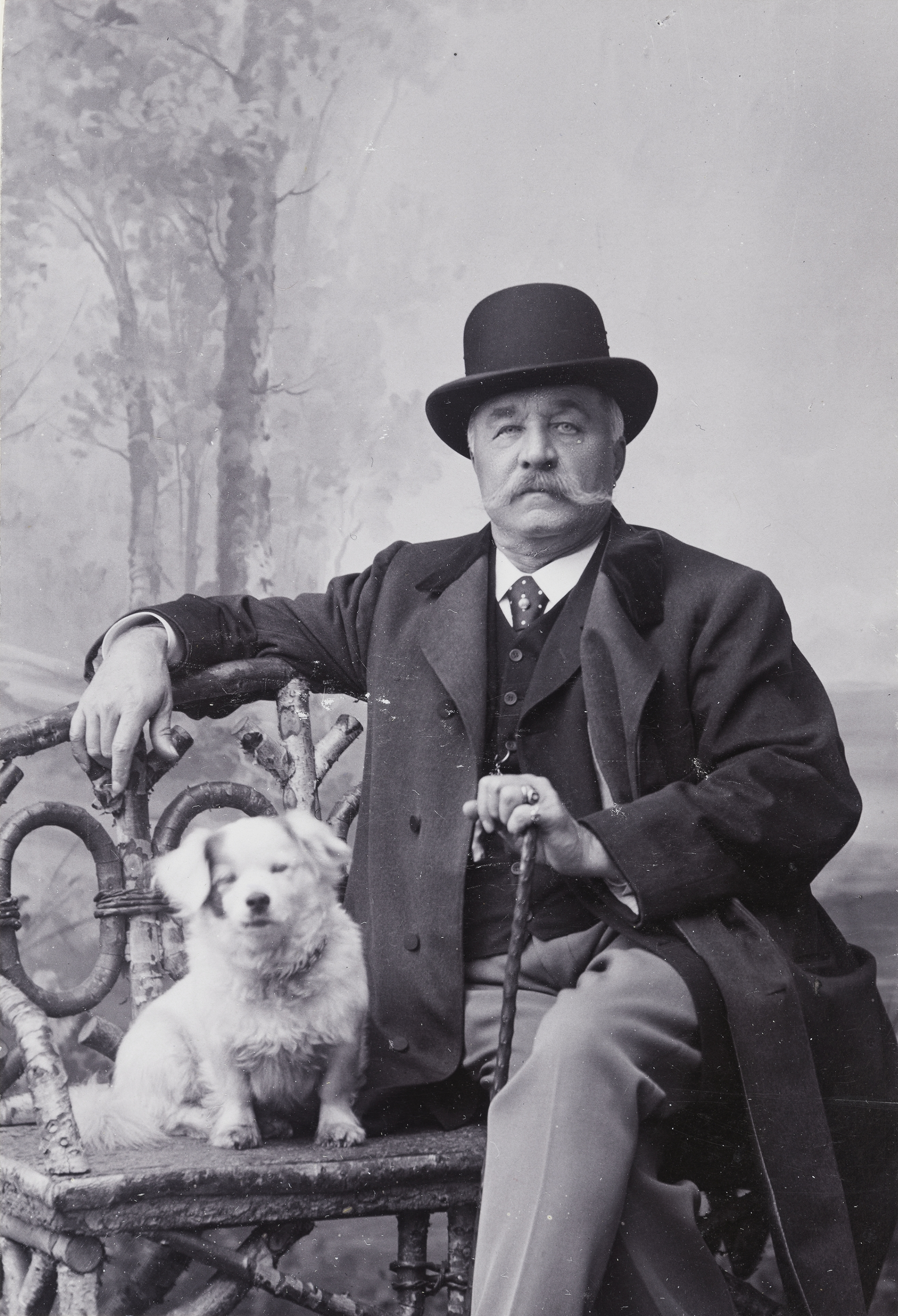
Portrait photograph with his dog in 1899–1905

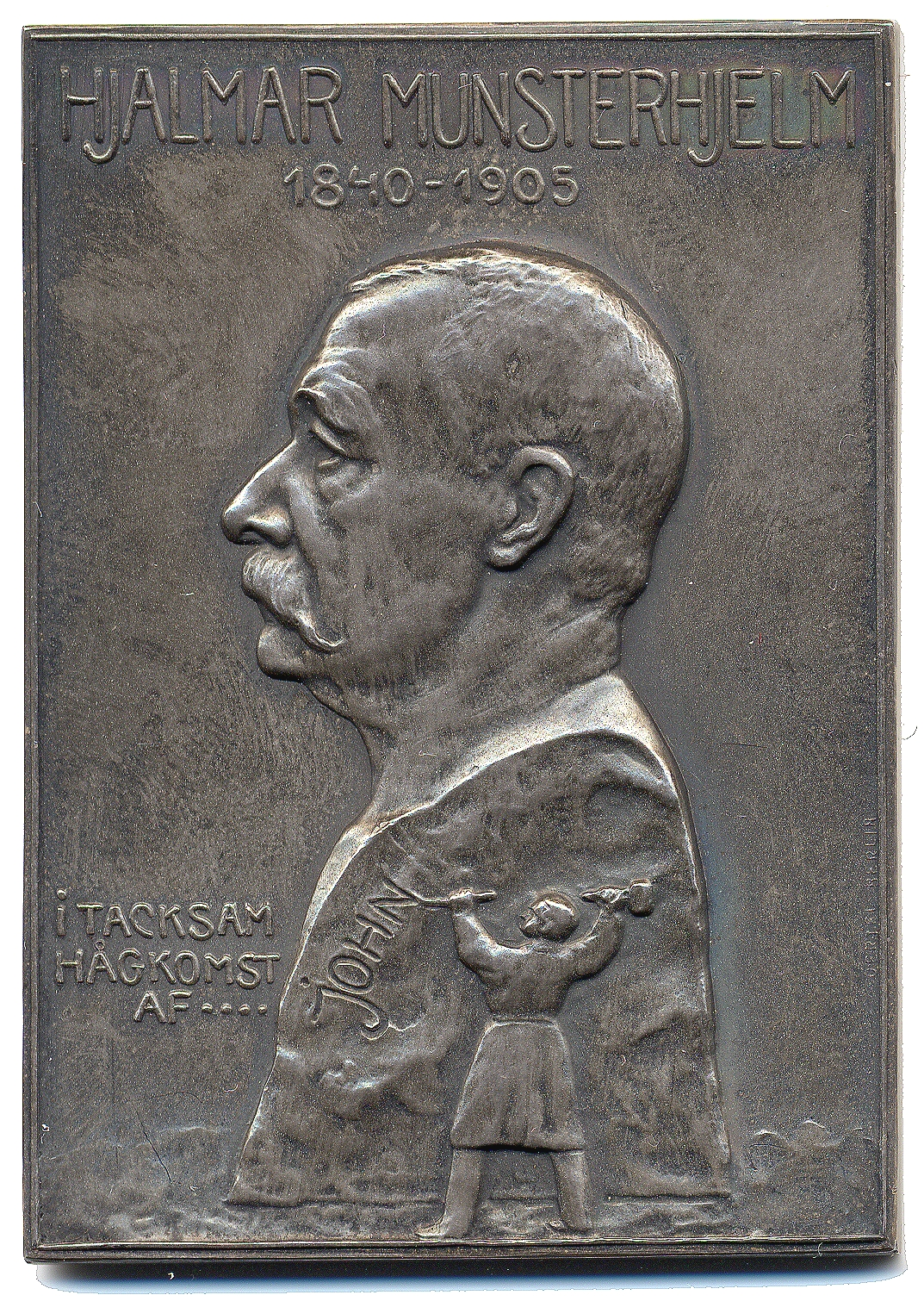
1923 silver commemorative medal of him by his son John Munsterhjelm (depicted sculpting him in the medal)

He married Olga Mathilda Tanninen (1856–1929) in 1875. They had four children, one of whom was the sculptor John Munsterhjelm (1879–1925). Munsterhjelm became a member of the Royal Swedish Academy of Fine Arts in 1897.

He kept being highly productive all the way until his death in 1905 in Helsinki.

In current times his moonlight paintings are some his most famous and popular.

== Works ==
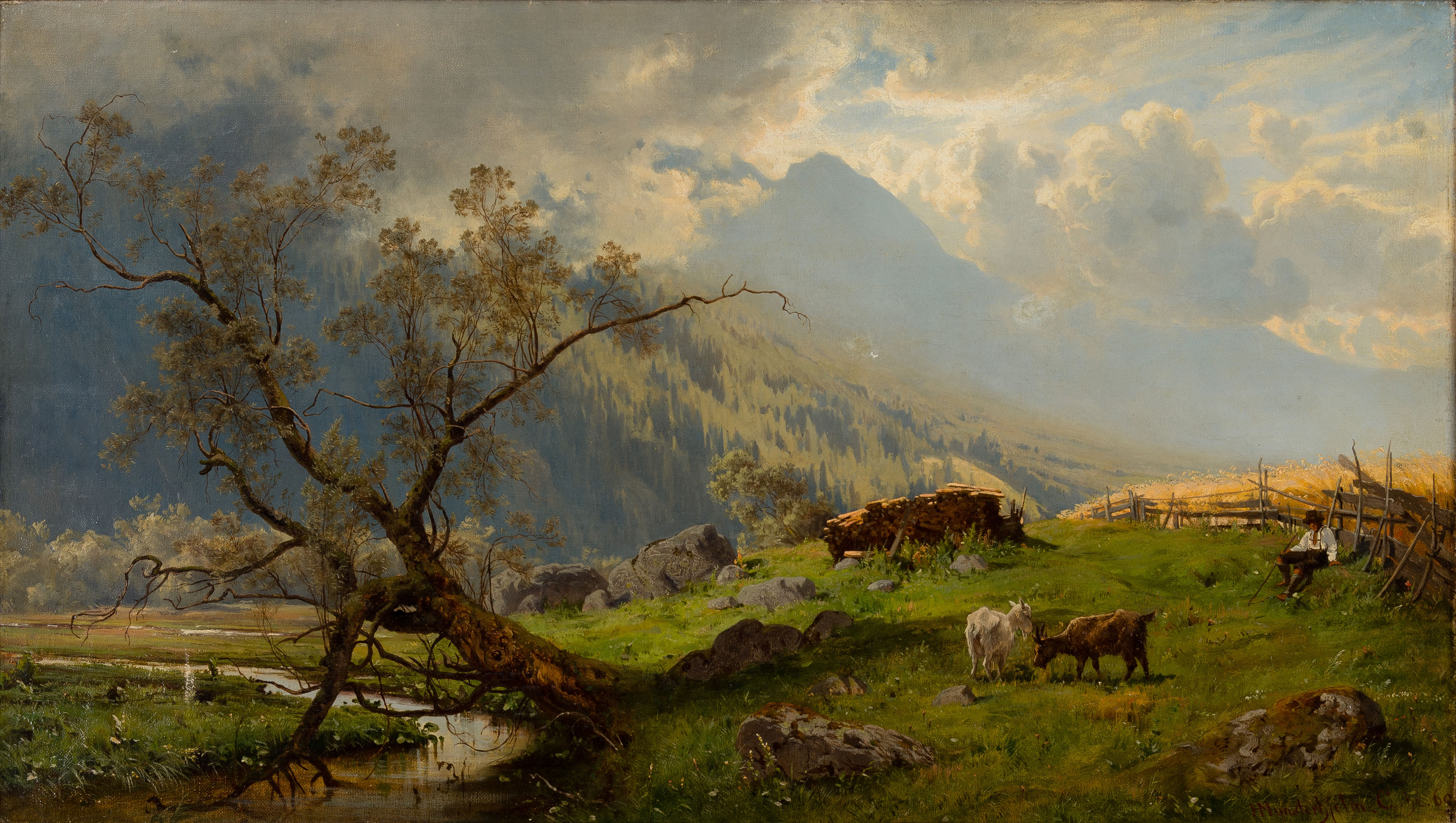
Shepherd in the Alps, 1860

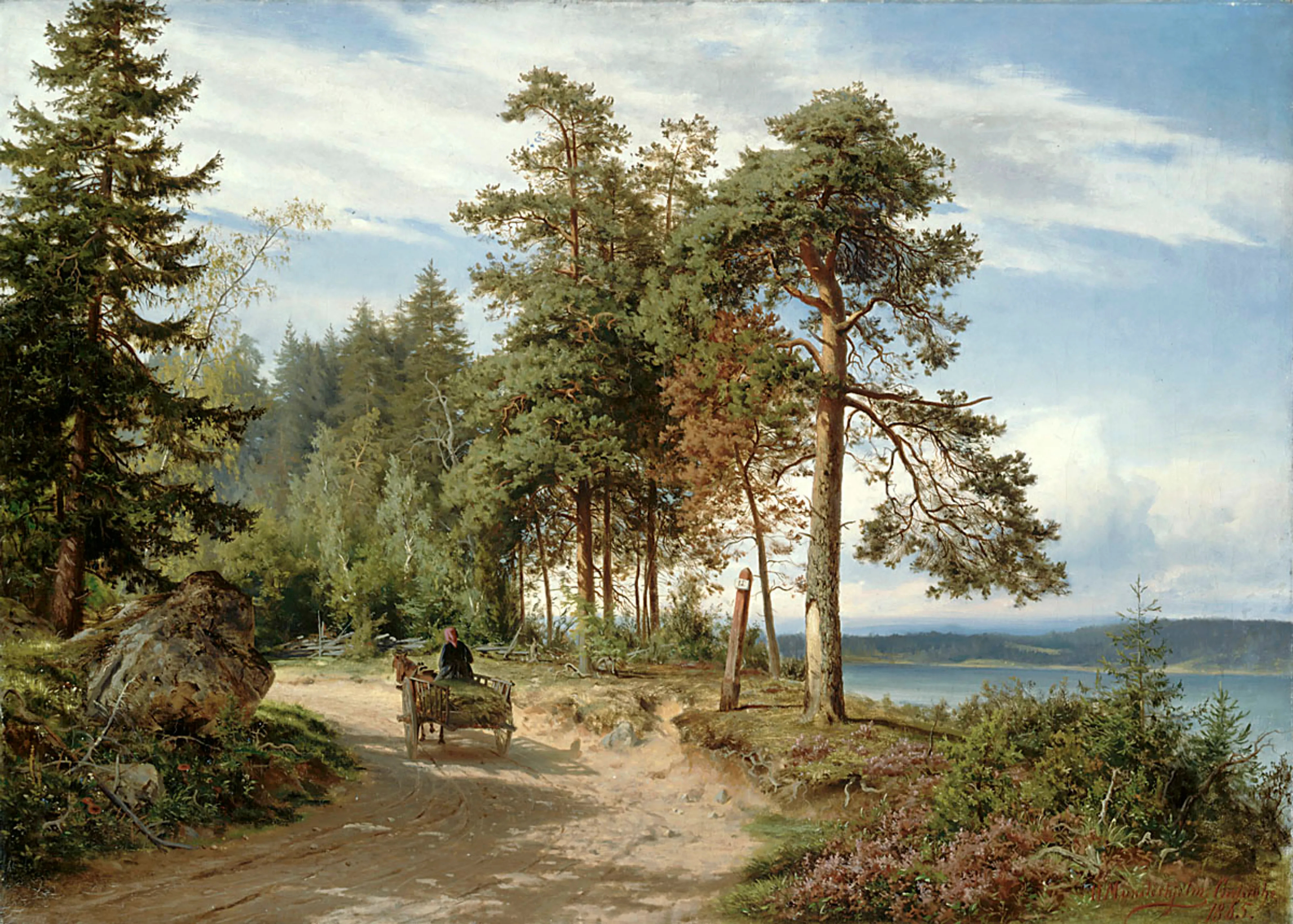
Road in Finland, 1865

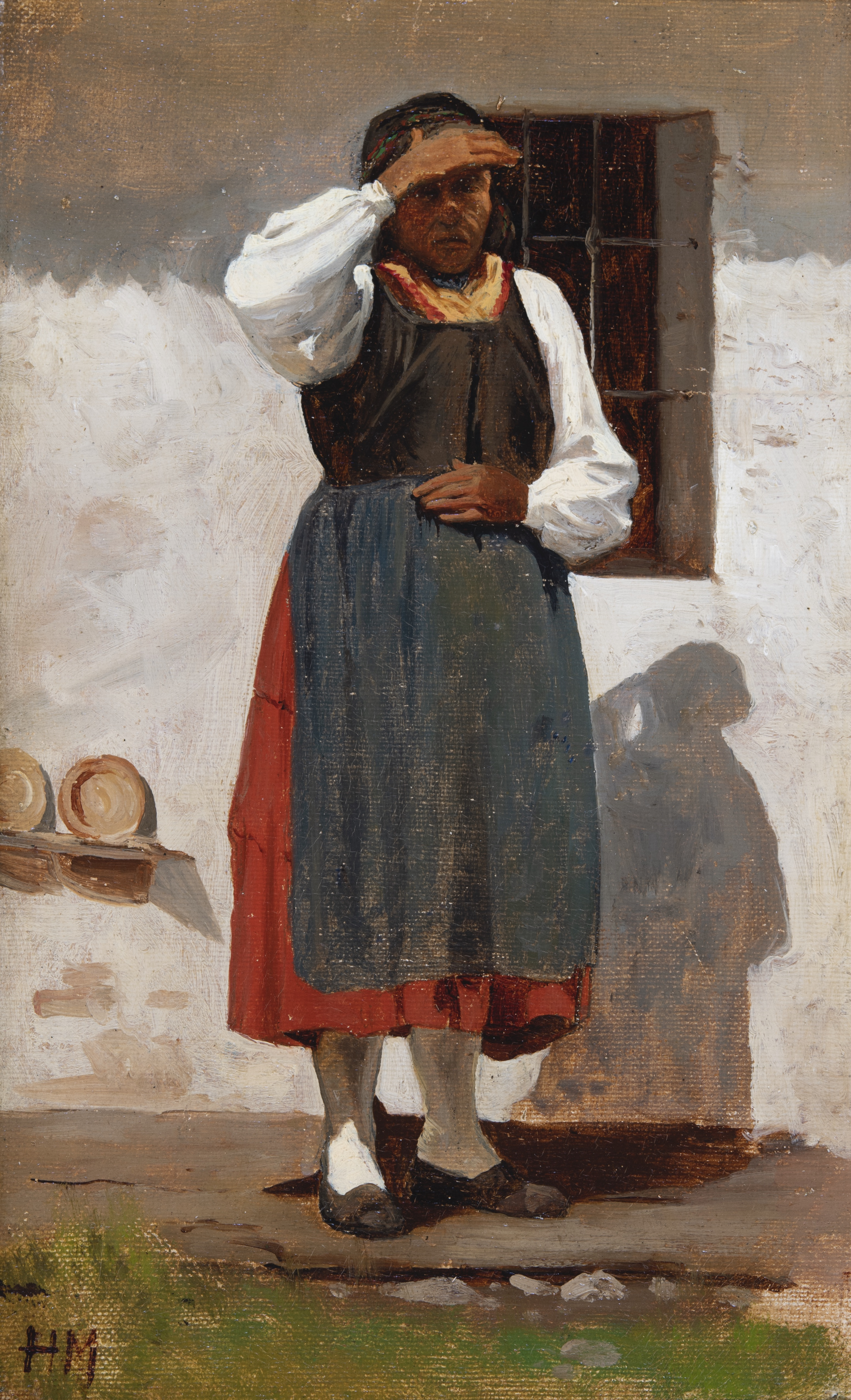
Peasant Woman from Bayern, 1860s

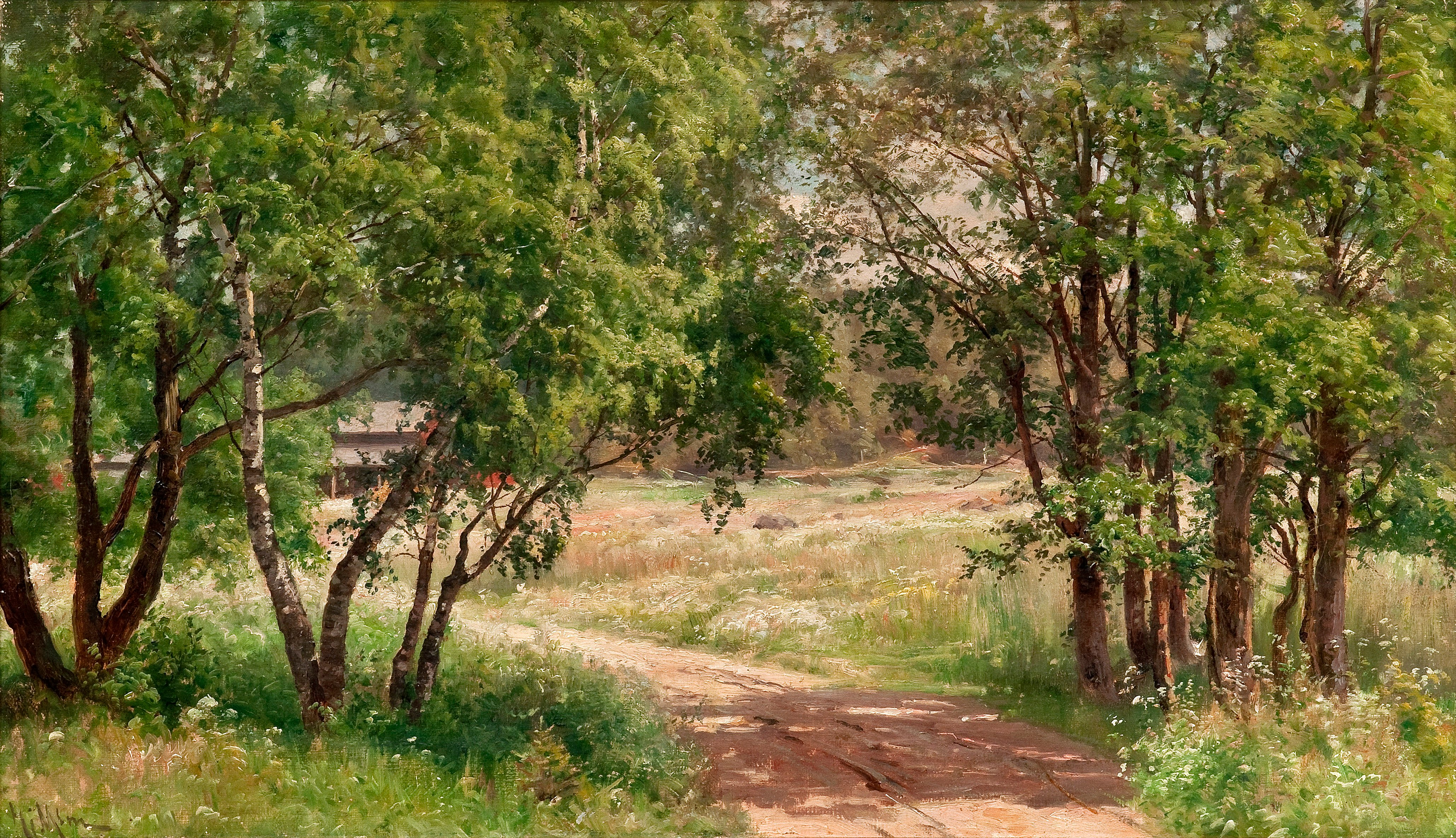
Birches in Summer, 1869

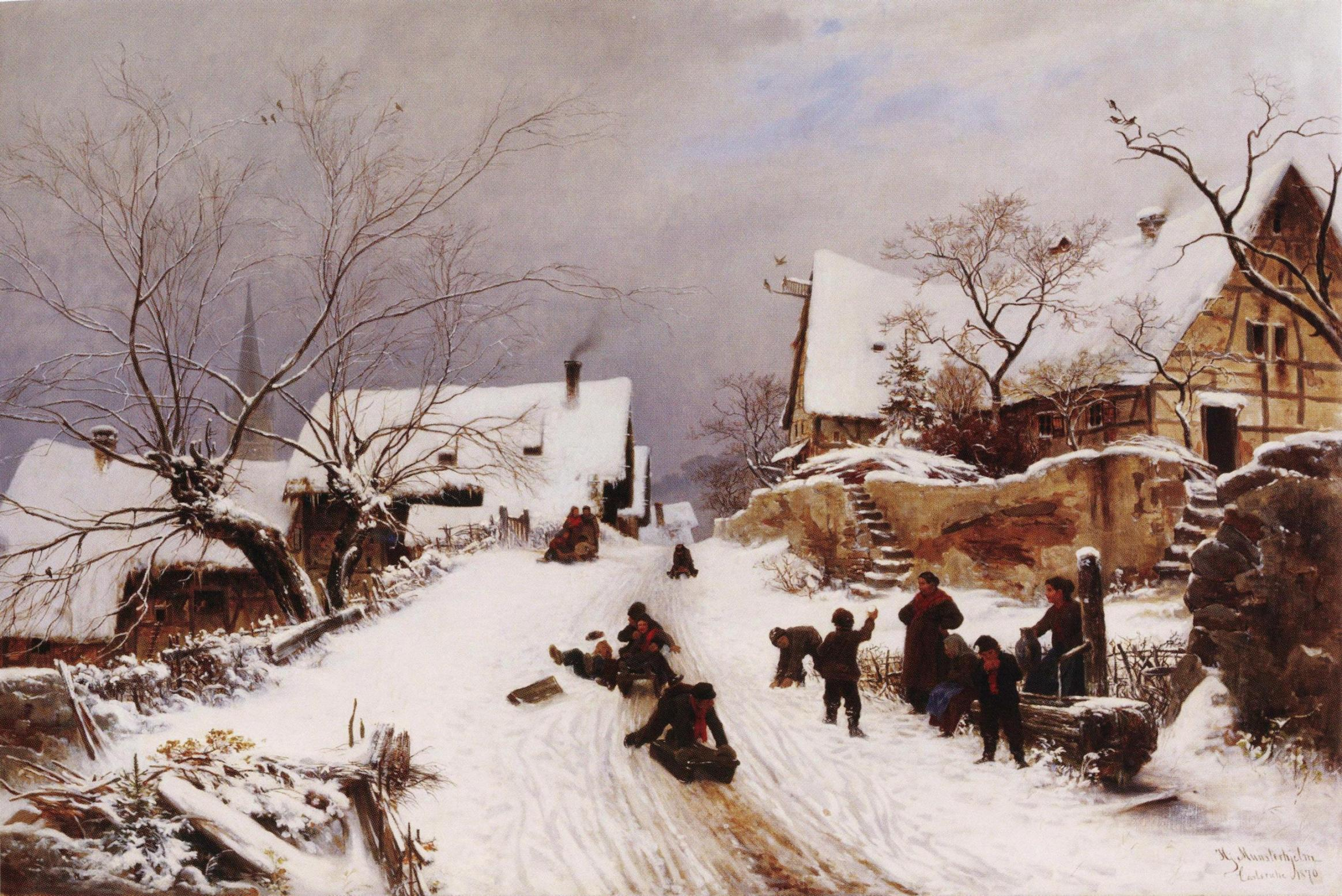
Village Street in Schwartzwald, 1870

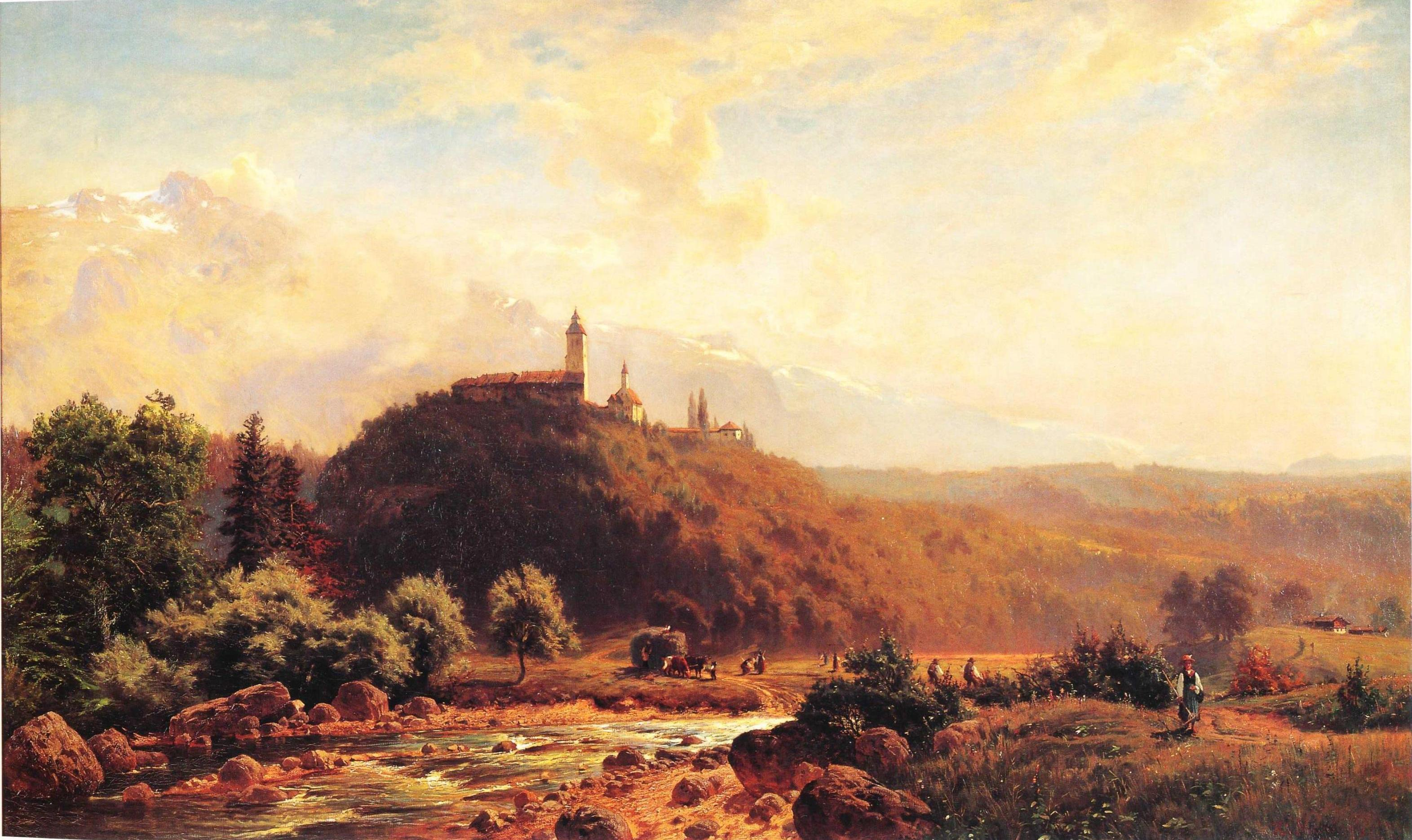
Landscape from Hohenaschau, 1871

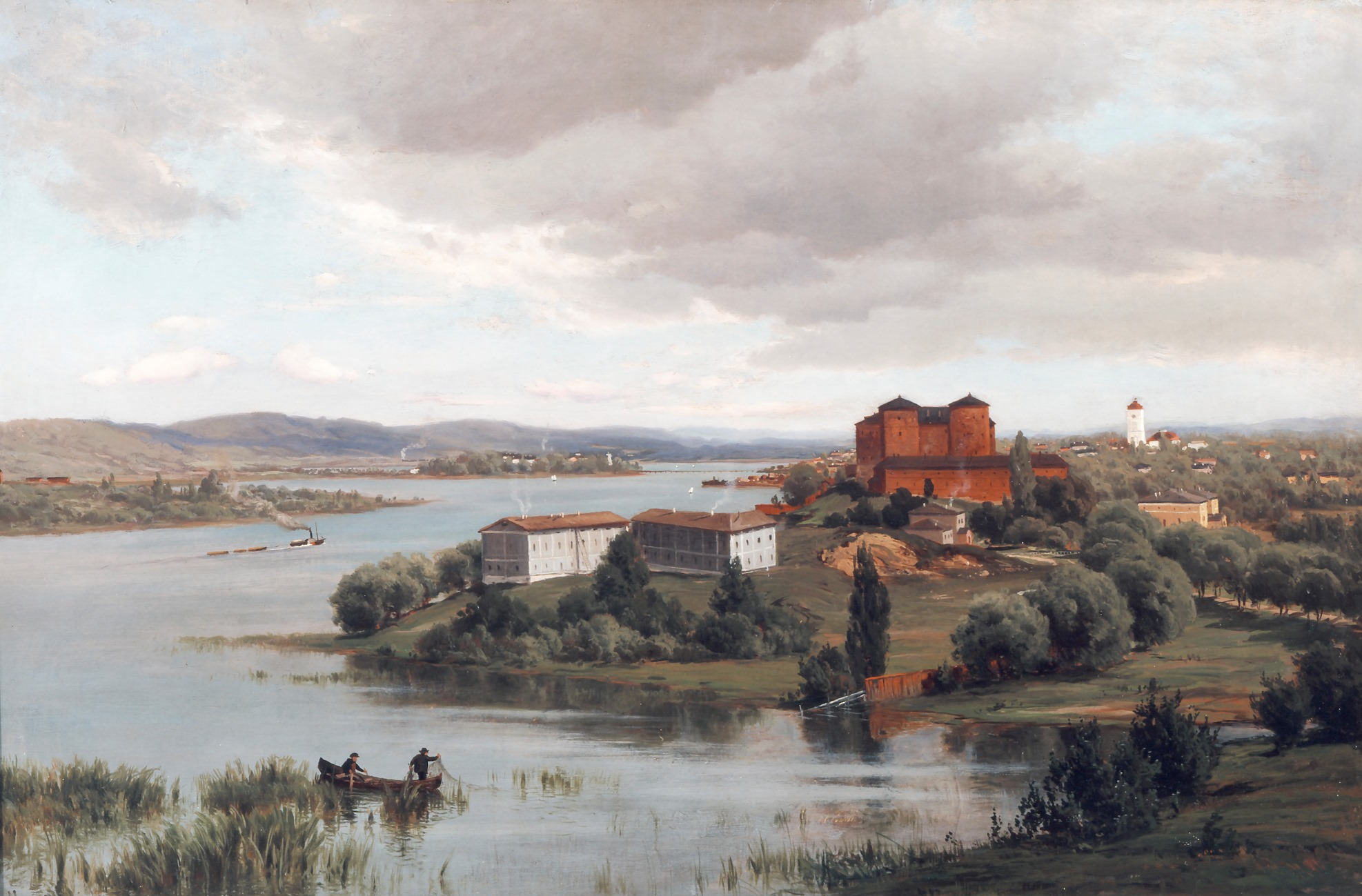
Häme Castle, 1872

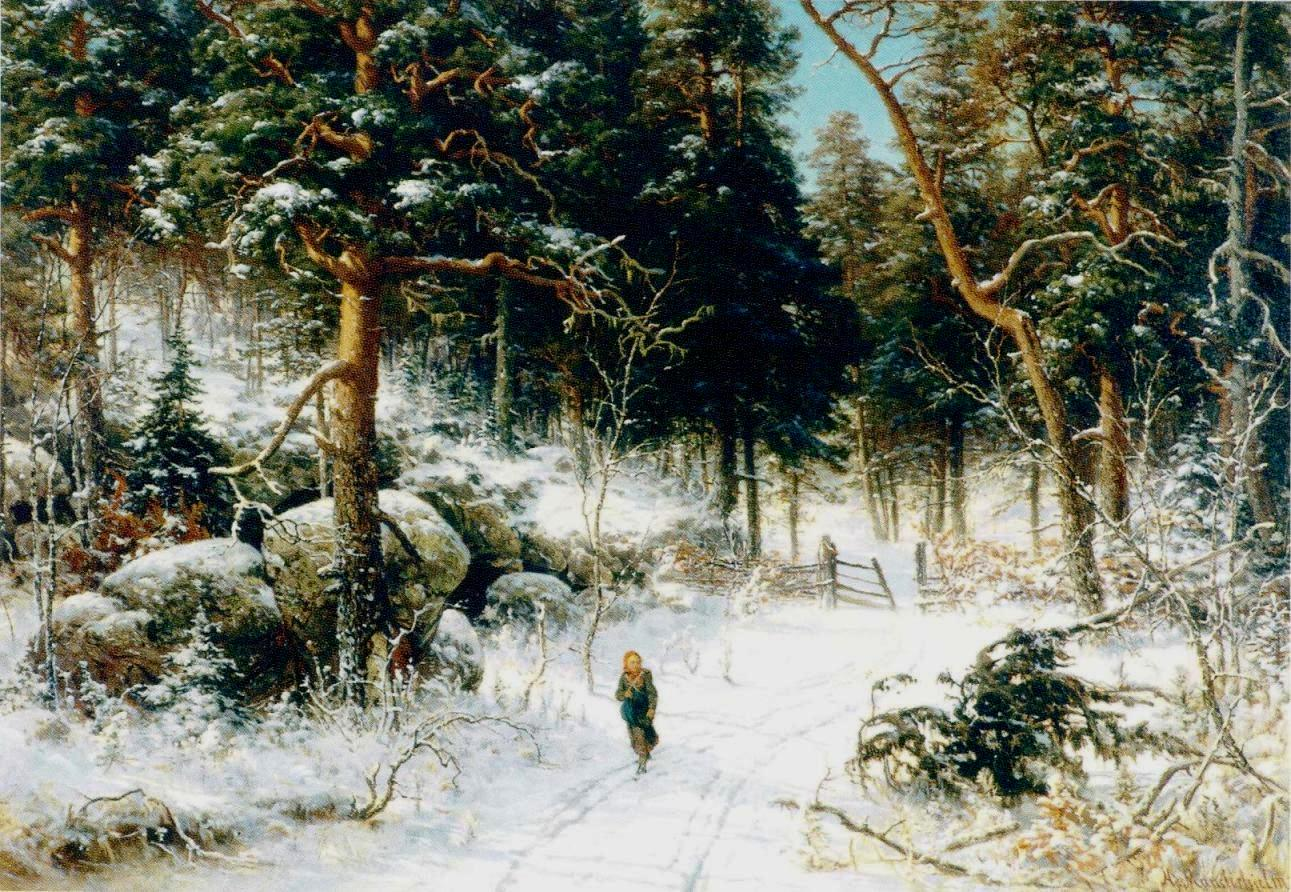
Winter Landscape from Tuulos, 1874

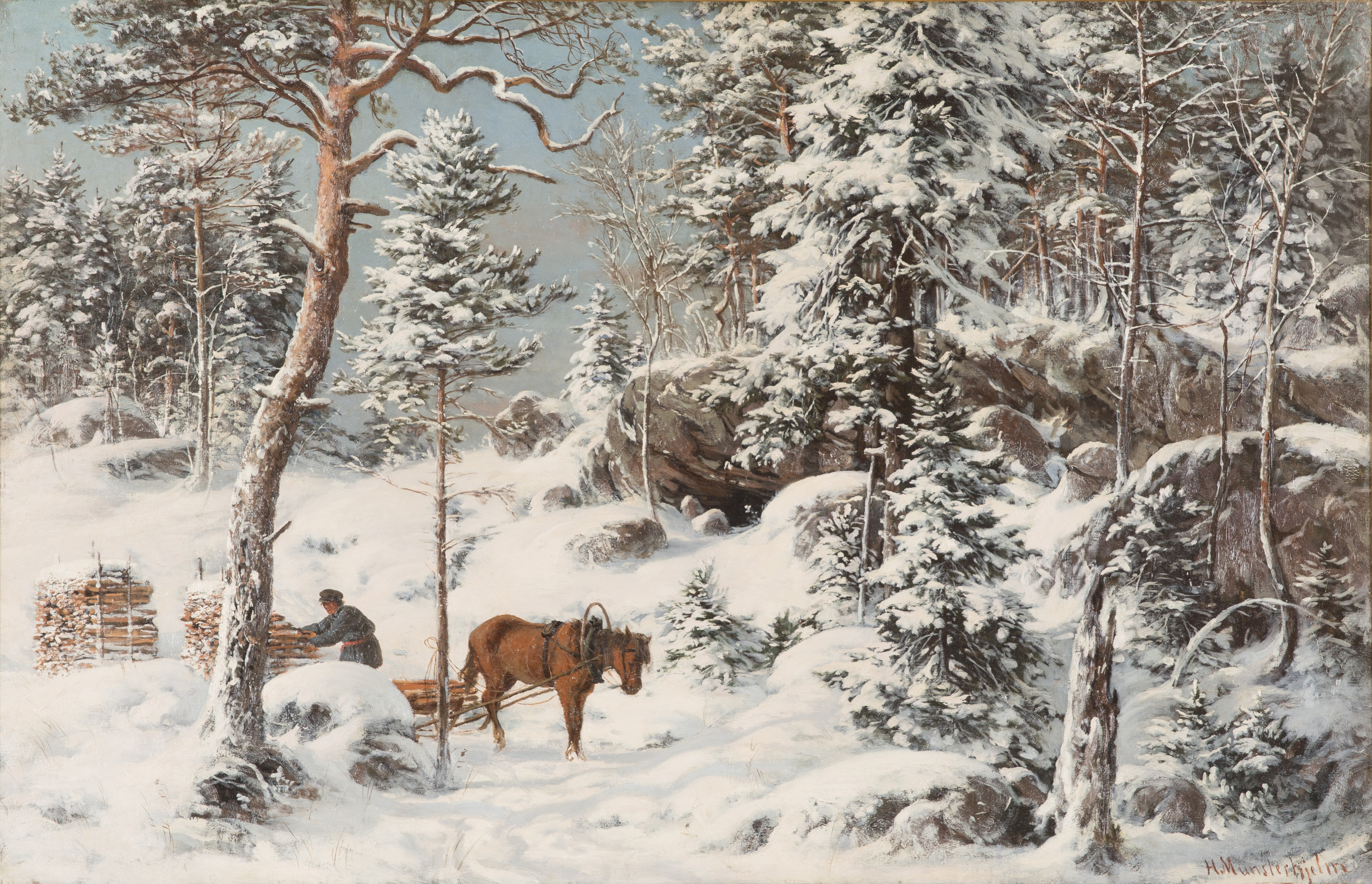
Woodland in Hauho, Häme

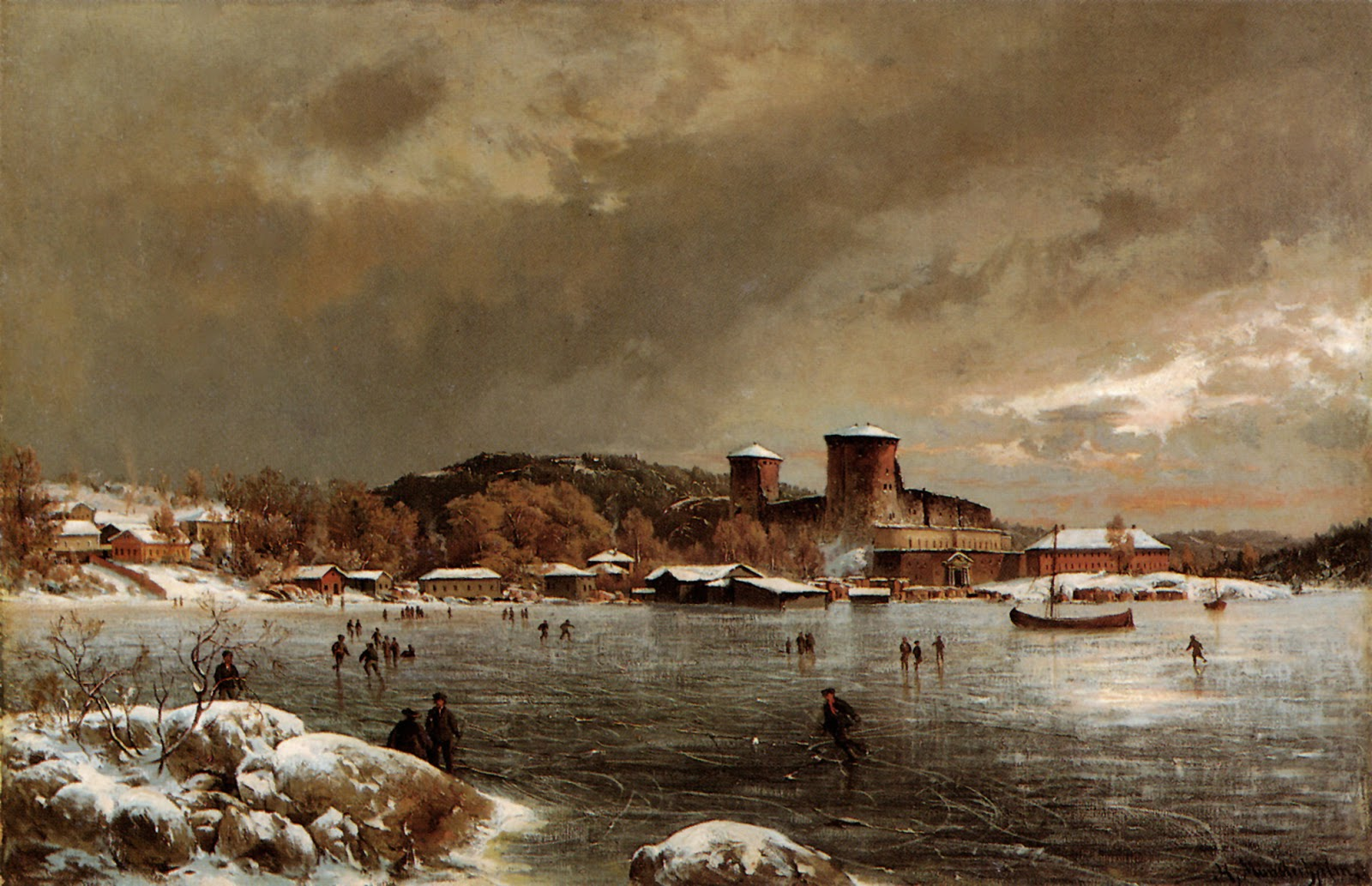
Olavinlinna (Winter), 1870s

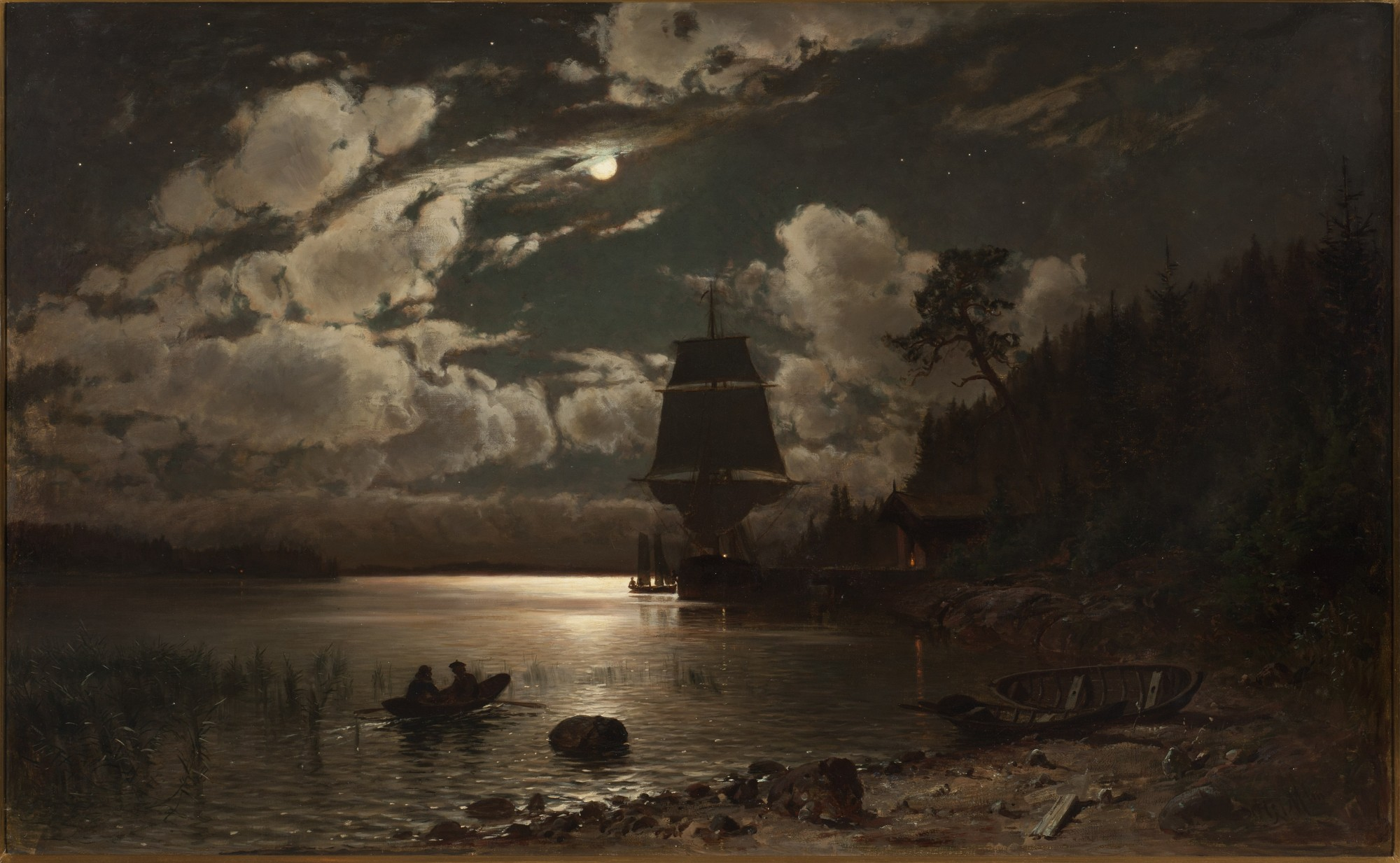
Moonlight in Barösund, late 1870s

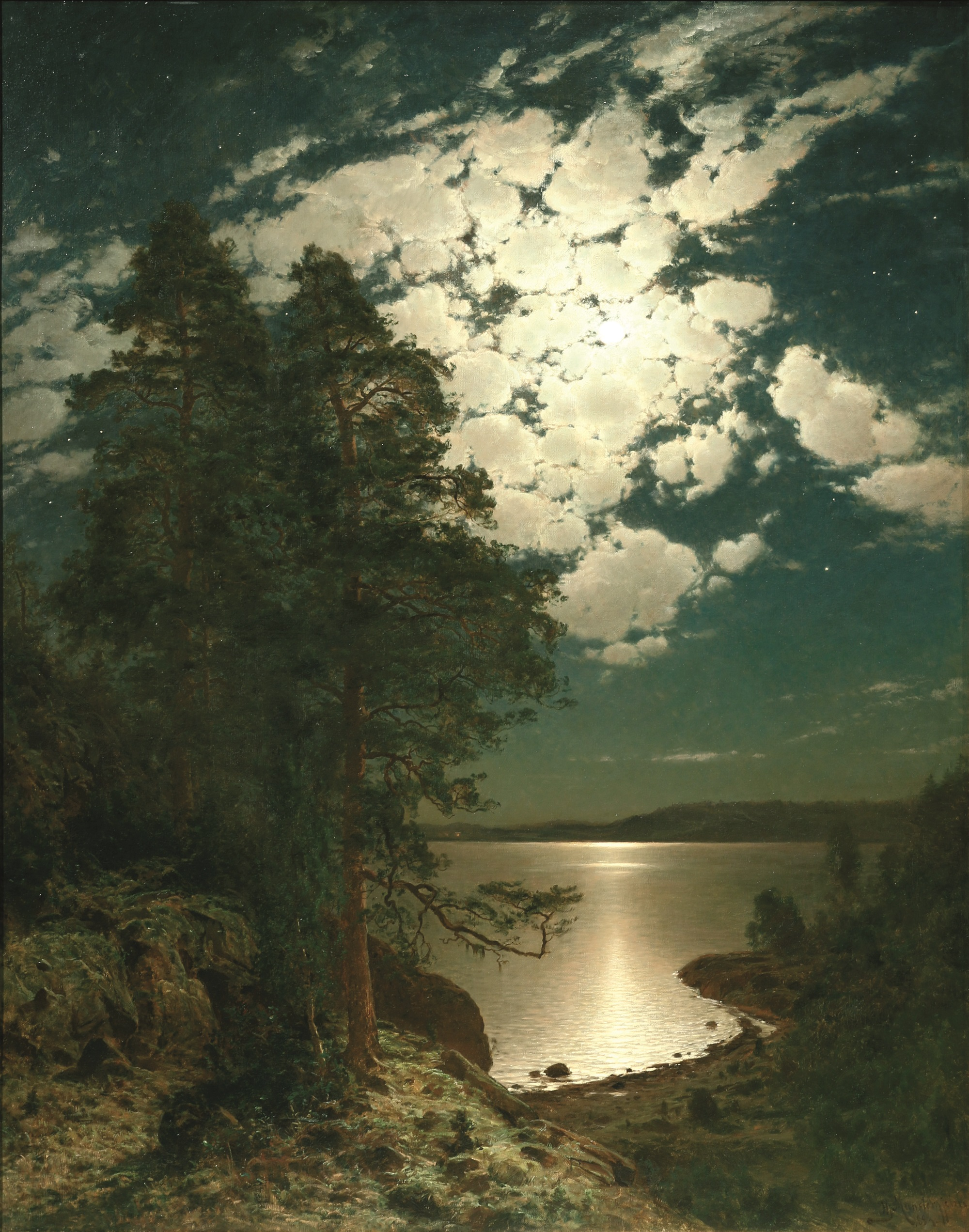
Moonlit Night, 1883

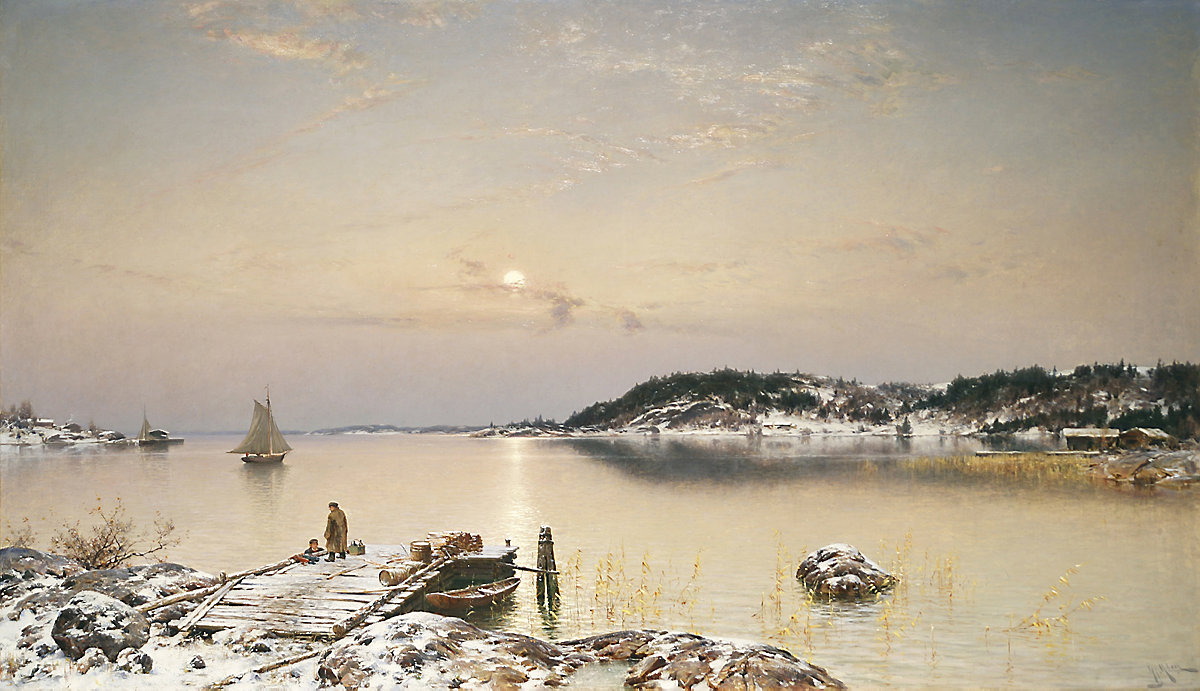
October Evening After the First Snowfall, 1883

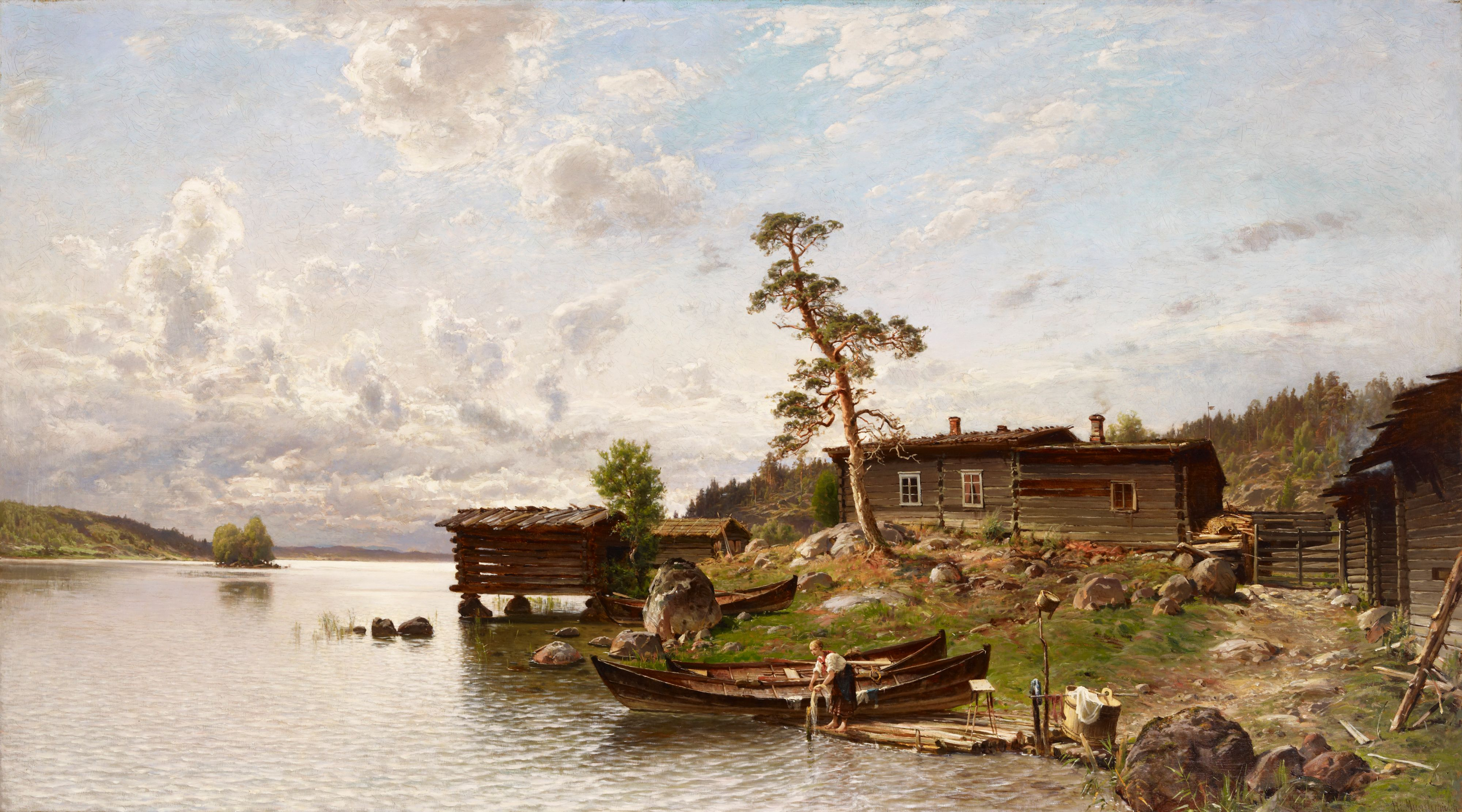
Morning Atmosphere (Island View), 1884

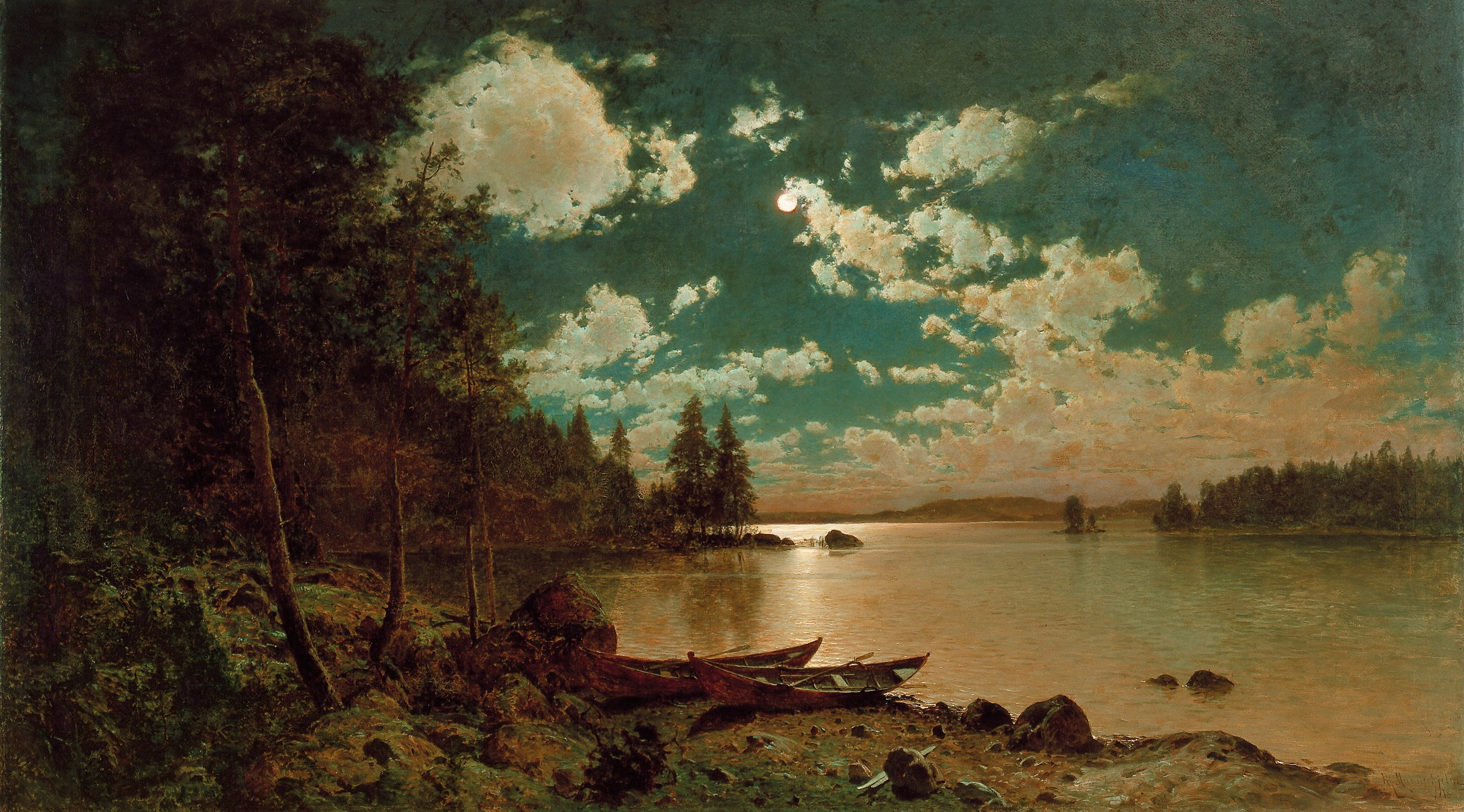
Moonlight, 1885

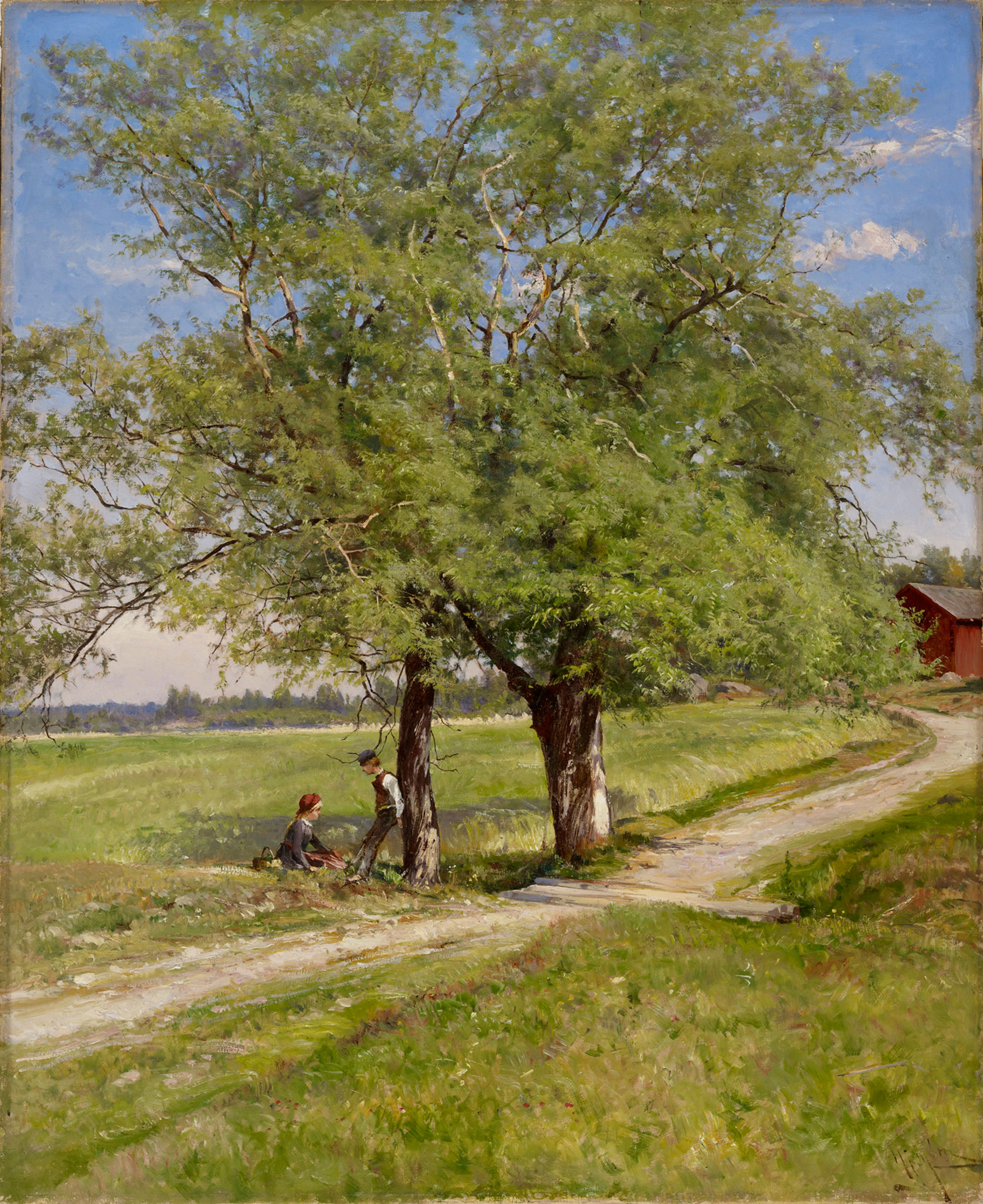
Crack Willows, 1897

== See also ==
- Finnish art

== Literary sources ==
- С. Н. Кондаков (1915). Юбилейный справочник Императорской Академии художеств. 1764-1914 (in Russian). Vol. 2. p. 134.
