= Sarah Page =

Sarah Page may refer to:

- Sarah Page, a character in the science fiction television series Primeval
- Sarah Page (prohibitionist) (1863–1950), New Zealand teacher, feminist, prohibitionist, socialist, social reformer, and politician
- Sarah Page, the White-American girl, allegation of sexual assault against Black-American Dick Rowland, impetus of the Tulsa race massacre

== See also ==
- Sara Page, British artist
