= Pascal Dagnan-Bouveret =

French painter

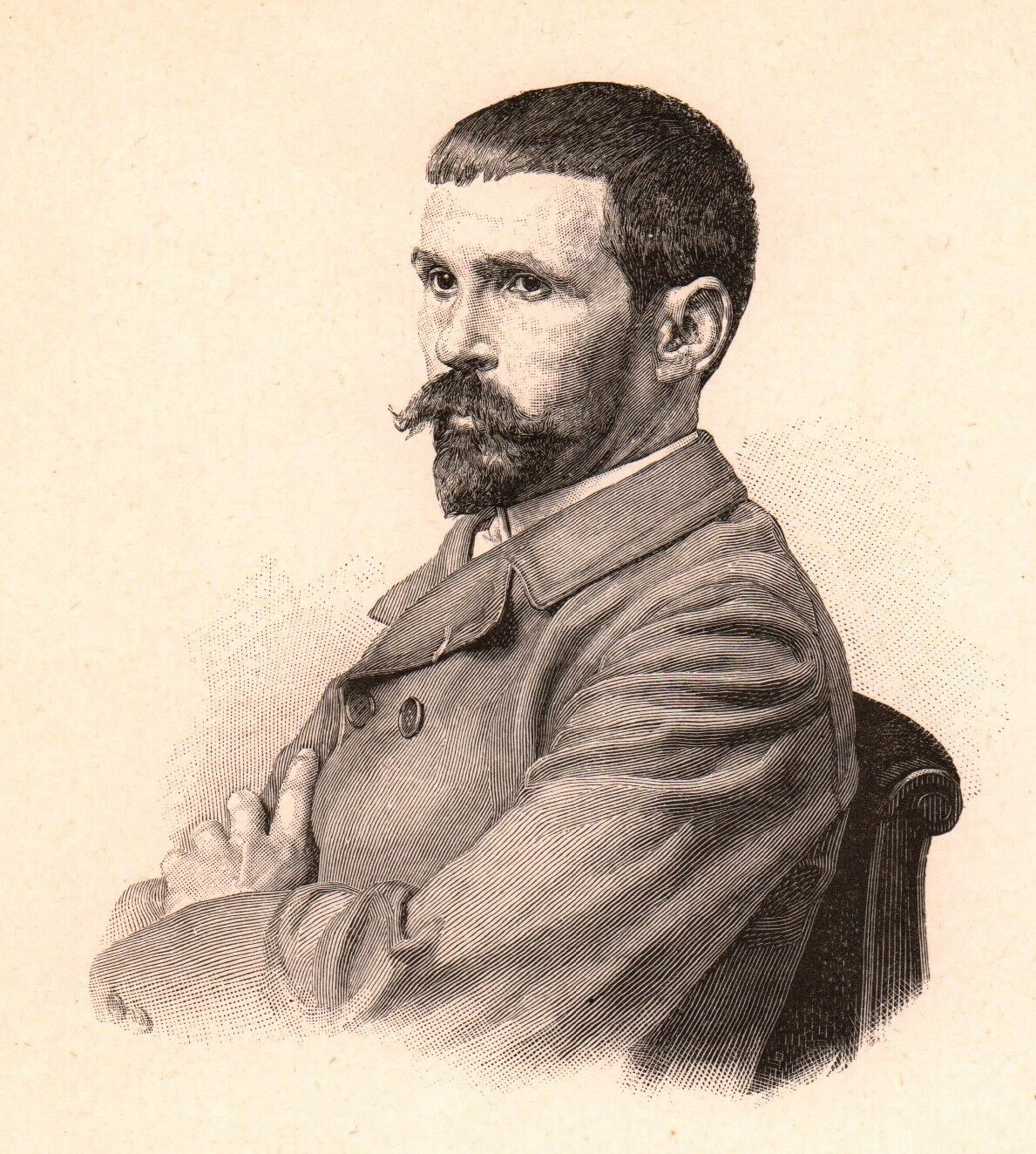
- Pascal Dagnan-Bouveret, c.1900. From the Figures contemporaines tirées de l’Album Mariani
- Born: 7 January 1852
- Died: 3 July 1929 (aged 77)
- Known for: Painting
- Movement: Naturalism

Pascal-Adolphe-Jean Dagnan-Bouveret (French: [paskal daɲɑ̃ buvʁɛ]; 7 January 1852 – 3 July 1929) was a French painter, one of the leading members of the naturalist school.

== Biography ==
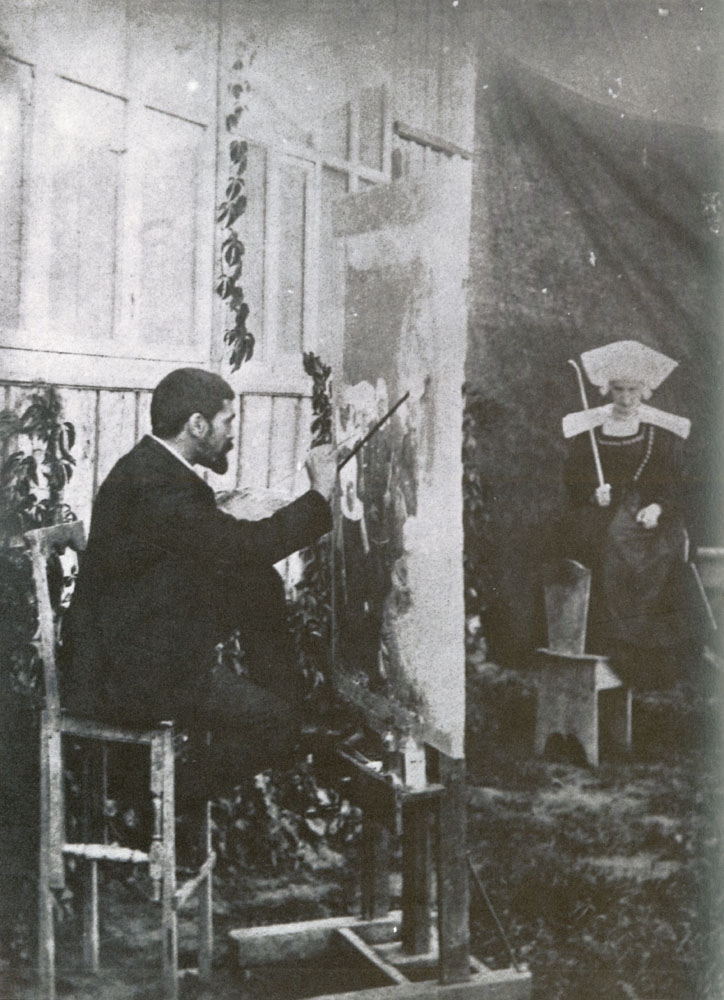
Painting The Pardon in Brittany in 1886 with model Walter

He was born in Paris, the son of a tailor, and was raised by his grandfather after his father emigrated to Brazil. Later he added his grandfather's name, Bouveret, to his own.

He became one of the leading French artists of the naturalist school and painted several paintings depicting Brittany. From 1869 he studied at the École des Beaux-Arts under Alexandre Cabanel and Jean-Léon Gérôme. From 1875 he exhibited at the Salon, where in 1880 he won the first-class medal for the painting "An Accident" and a medal of honour in 1885 for "Horses at the Watering Trough". From the 1880s Dagnan-Bouveret along with Gustave Courtois, maintained a studio in Neuilly-sur-Seine, a fashionable suburb of Paris. By that time he was recognized as a leading modern artist known for his peasant scenes, but also for his mystical-religious compositions. His large-scale painting "The Last Supper" was exhibited at the Salon de Champ-de-Mars in 1896. He was one of the first to use the then new medium of photography to bring greater realism to his paintings. In 1891 he was made an Officer of the Legion of Honour and in 1900 he became a member of the Institut de France. A number of his pictures were purchased by the British art collector George McCulloch, including The Madonna and Child 1880, Dans Le Foret, and a copy of La Cene (The Last Supper).

Dagnan-Bouveret was a close friend of the Finnish artist Albert Edelfelt. They met during their studies in Paris in the 1870s and were part of the artist circle around Jules Bastien-Lepage together with Gustave Courtois, among others.

== Works ==
Women from Brittany
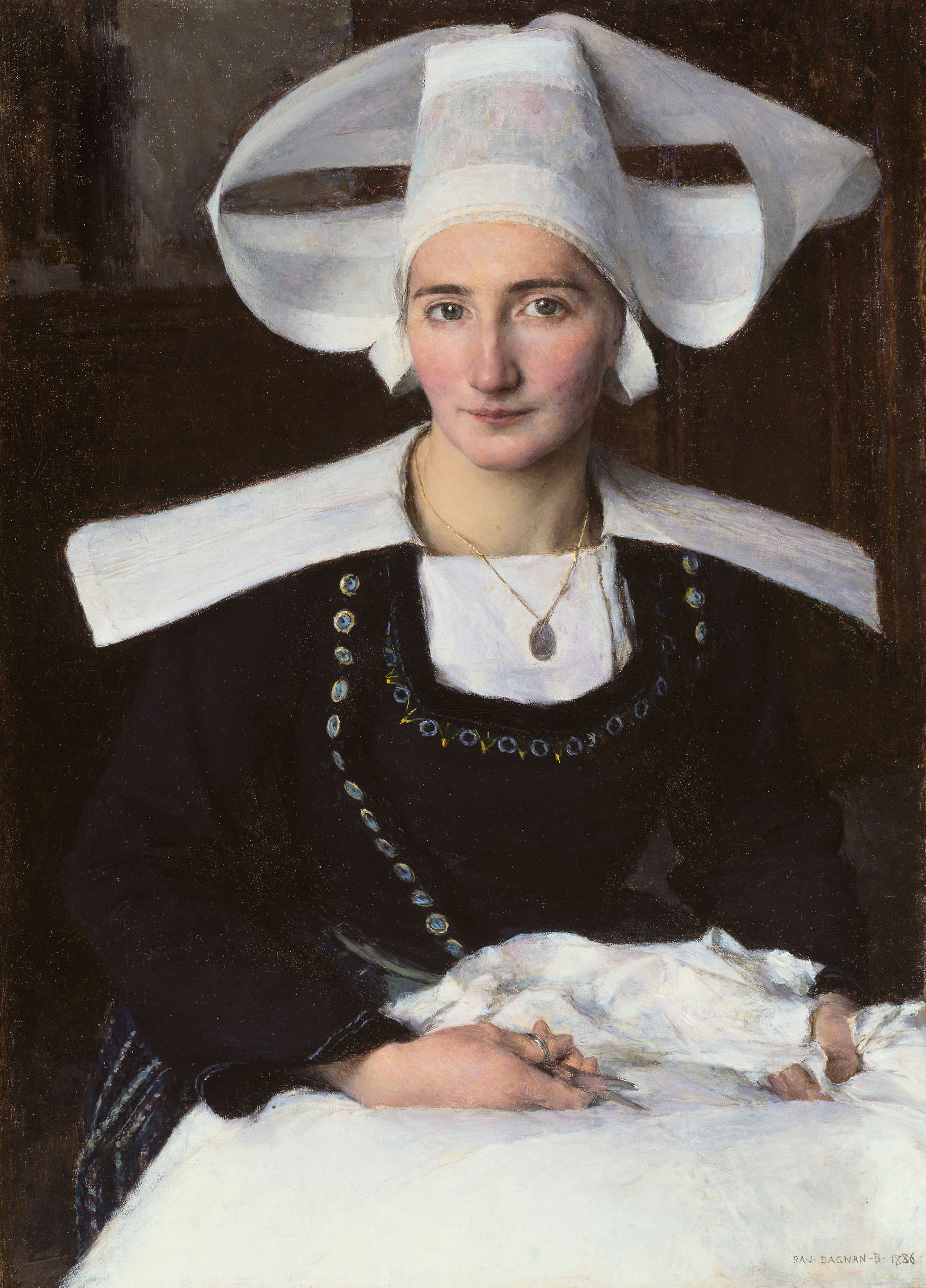
Woman from Brittany, 1886

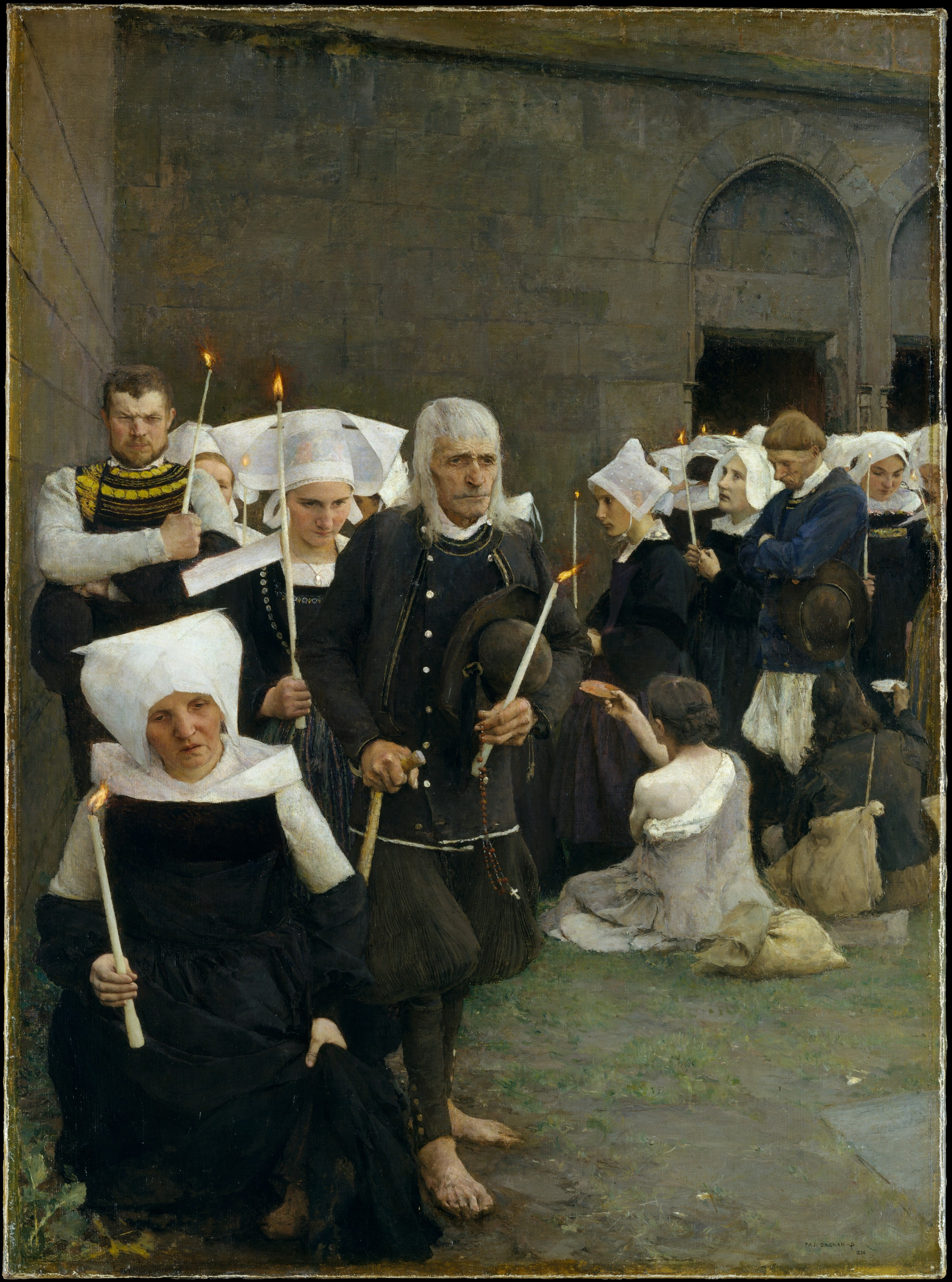
The Pardon in Brittany, 1886

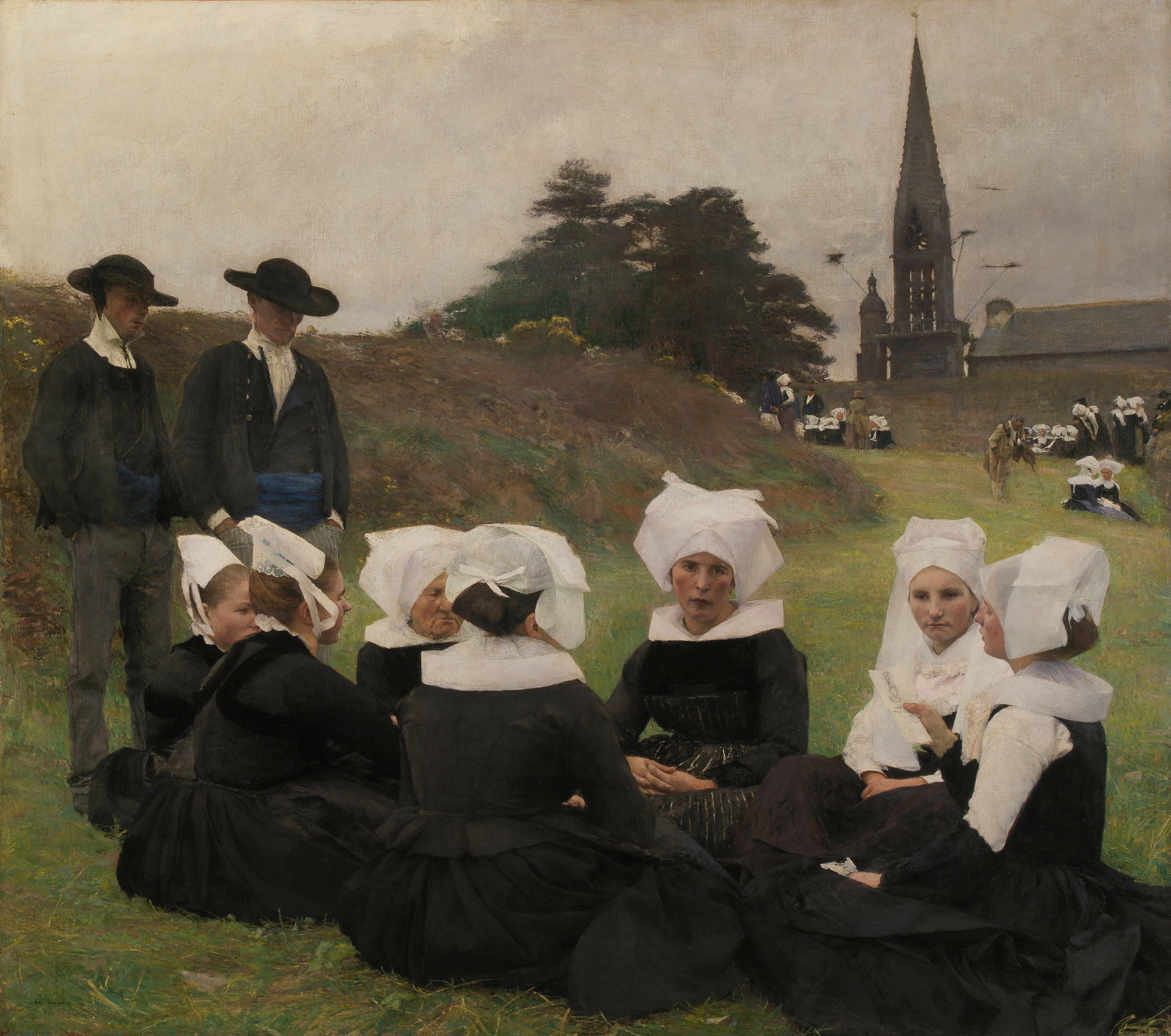
Breton Women at a Pardon, 1887

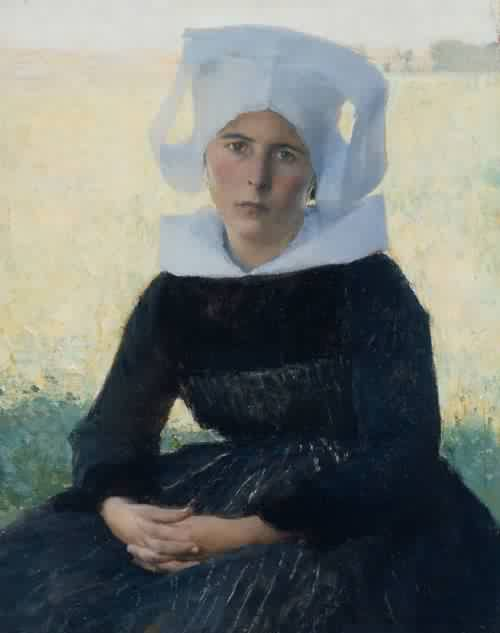
Woman in Breton Costume Seated in a Meadow, 1887

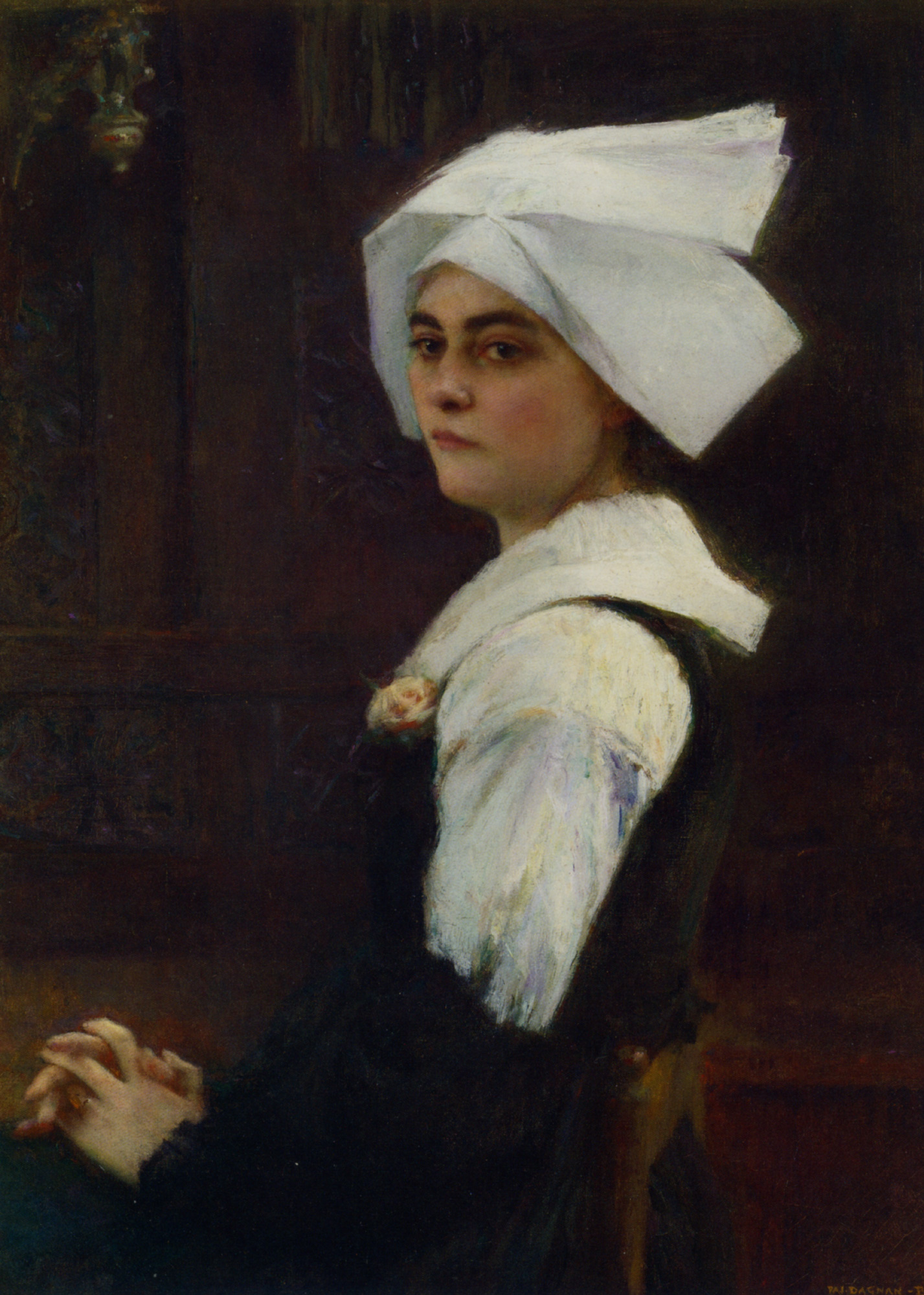
Portrait of a Brittany Girl, 1887

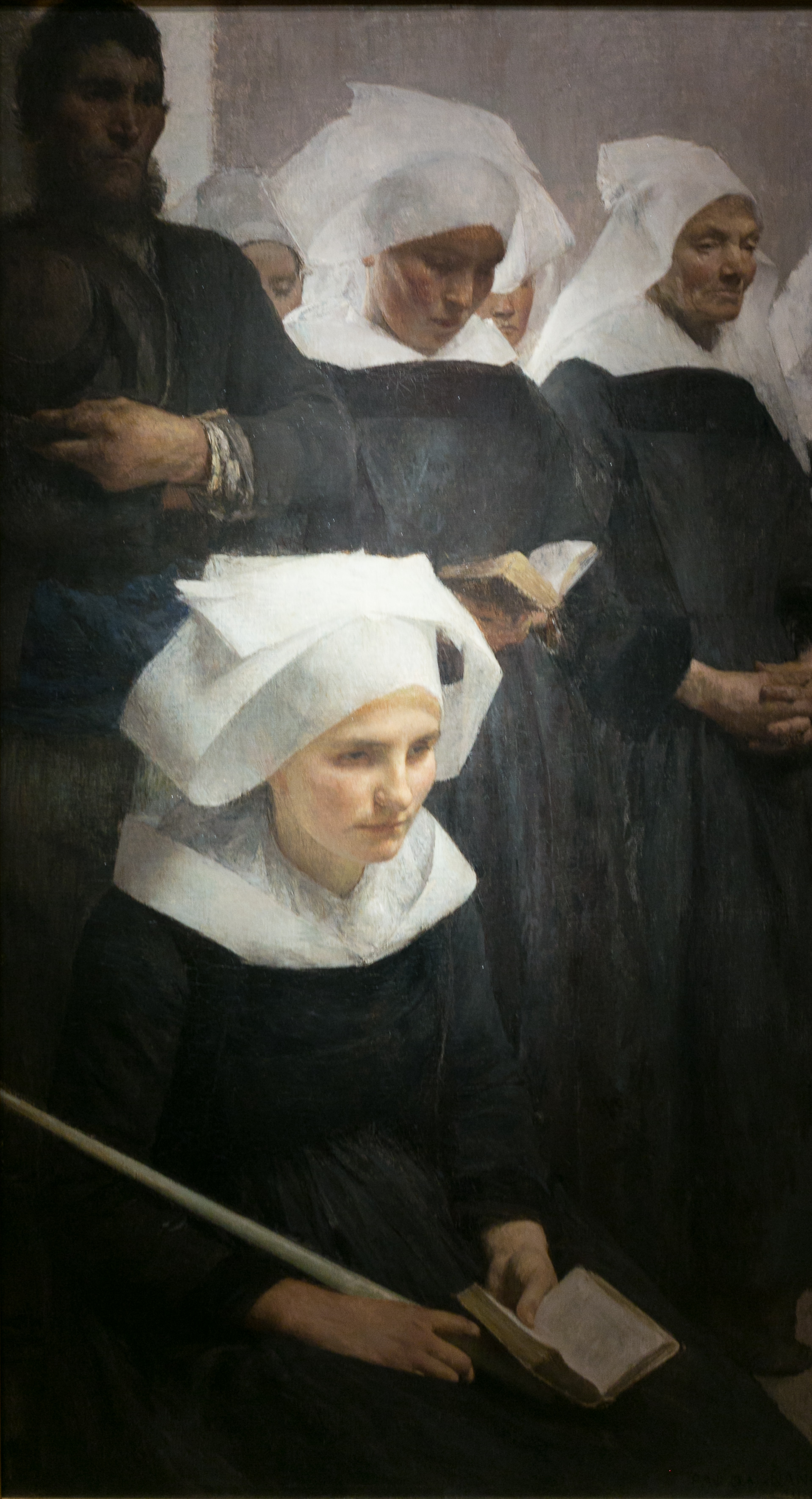
Bretons Praying, 1888
Other notable works

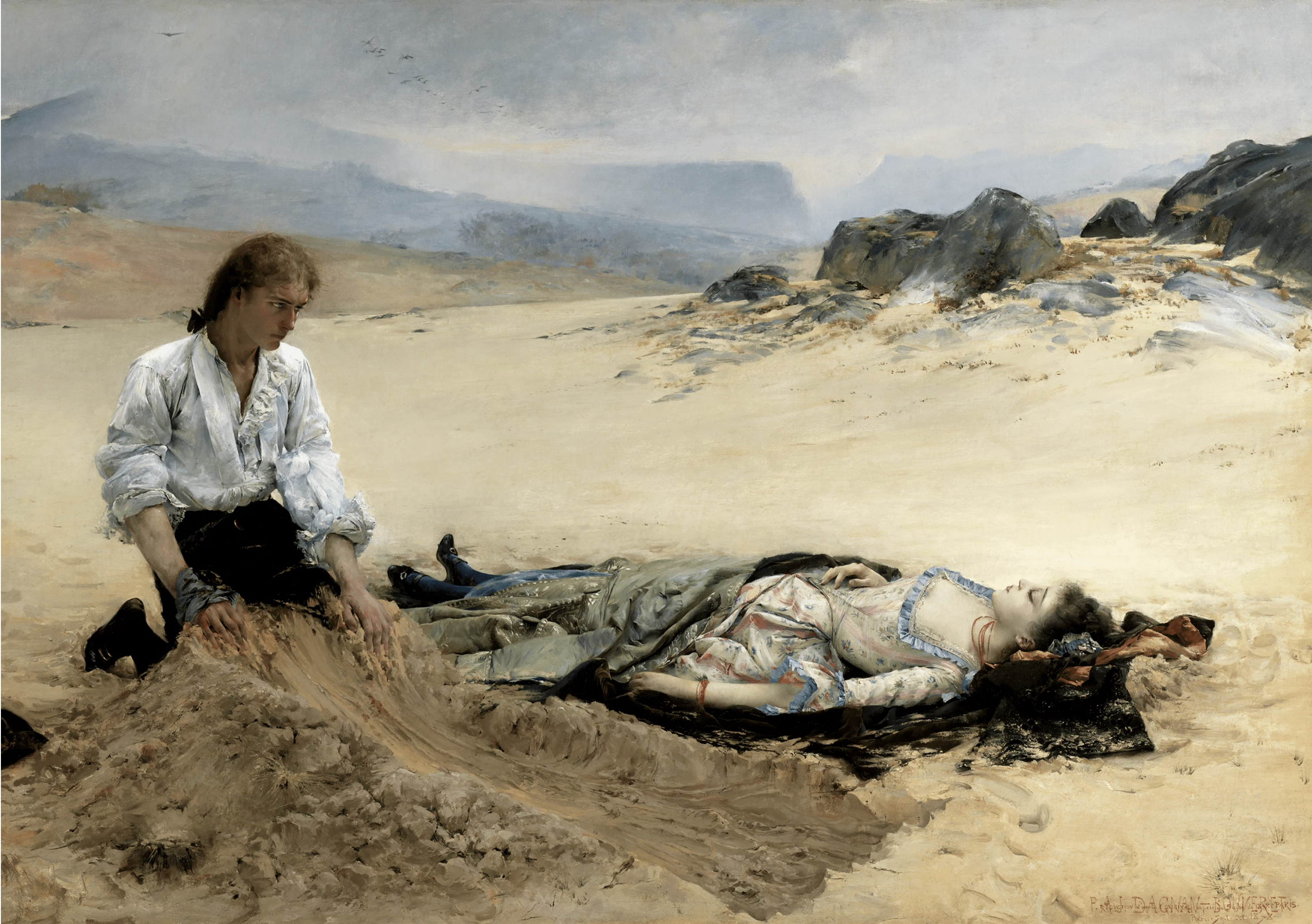
The Burial of Manon Lescaut, 1878

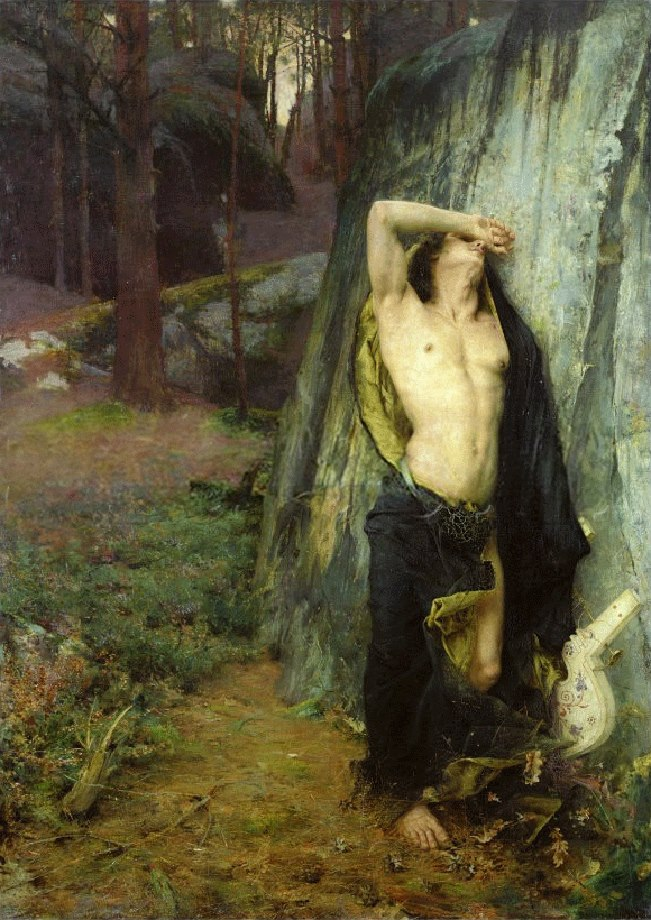
Orpheus' Sorrow, 1876

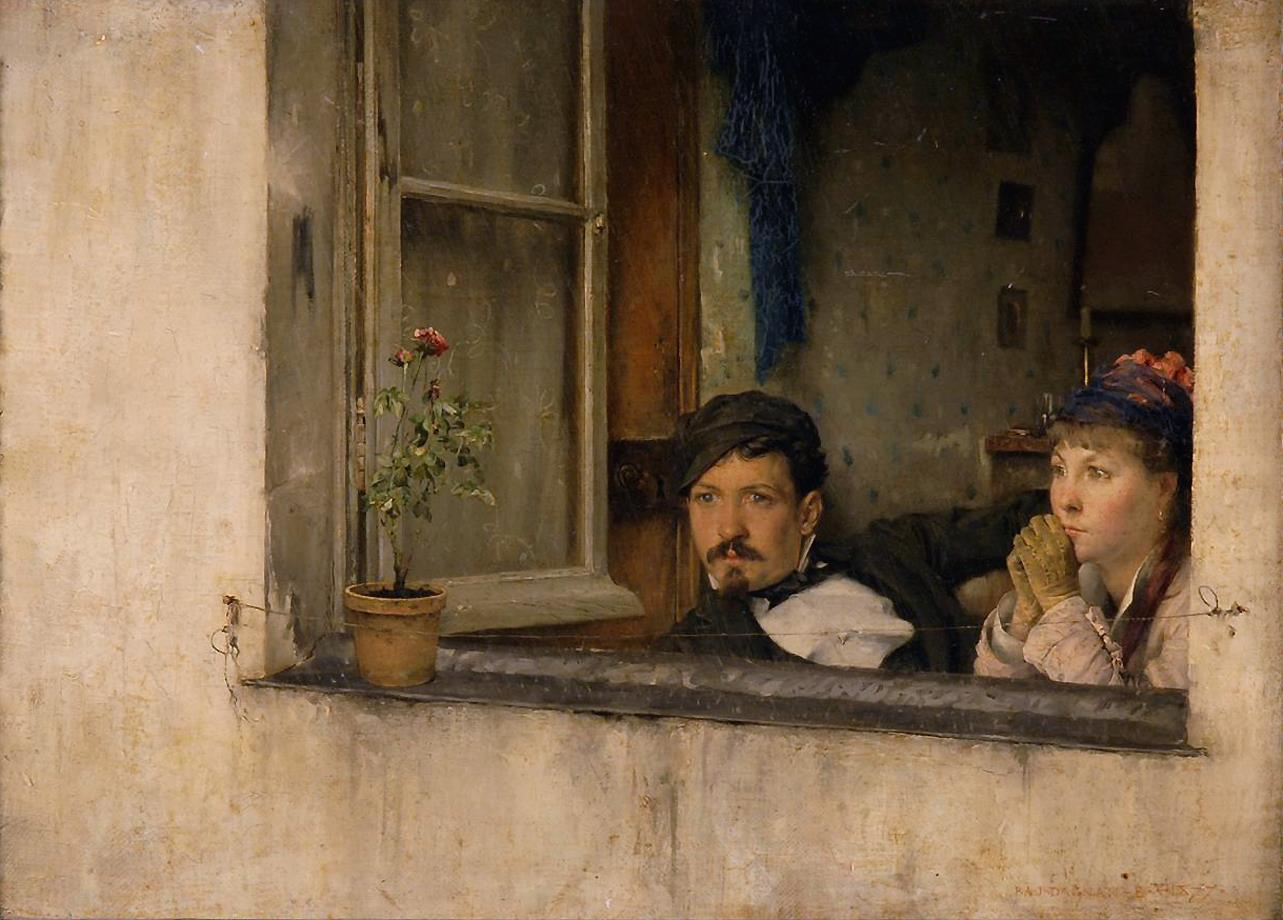
A Young Man and Woman Gaze Out a Window, 1877

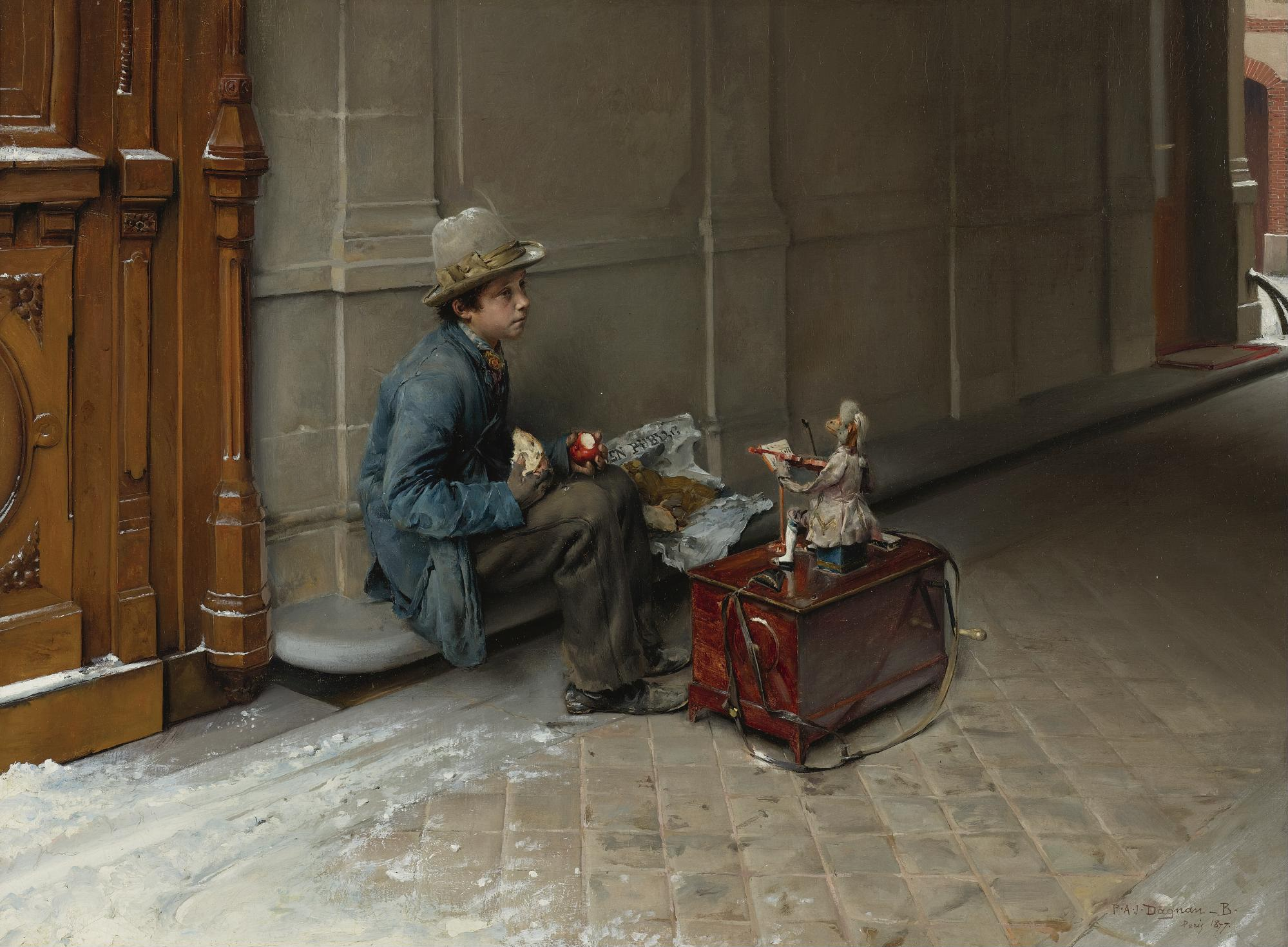
The Little Savoyard Eating in front of an Entrance to a House, 1877

Wedding in the Photographer’s Studio, 1879

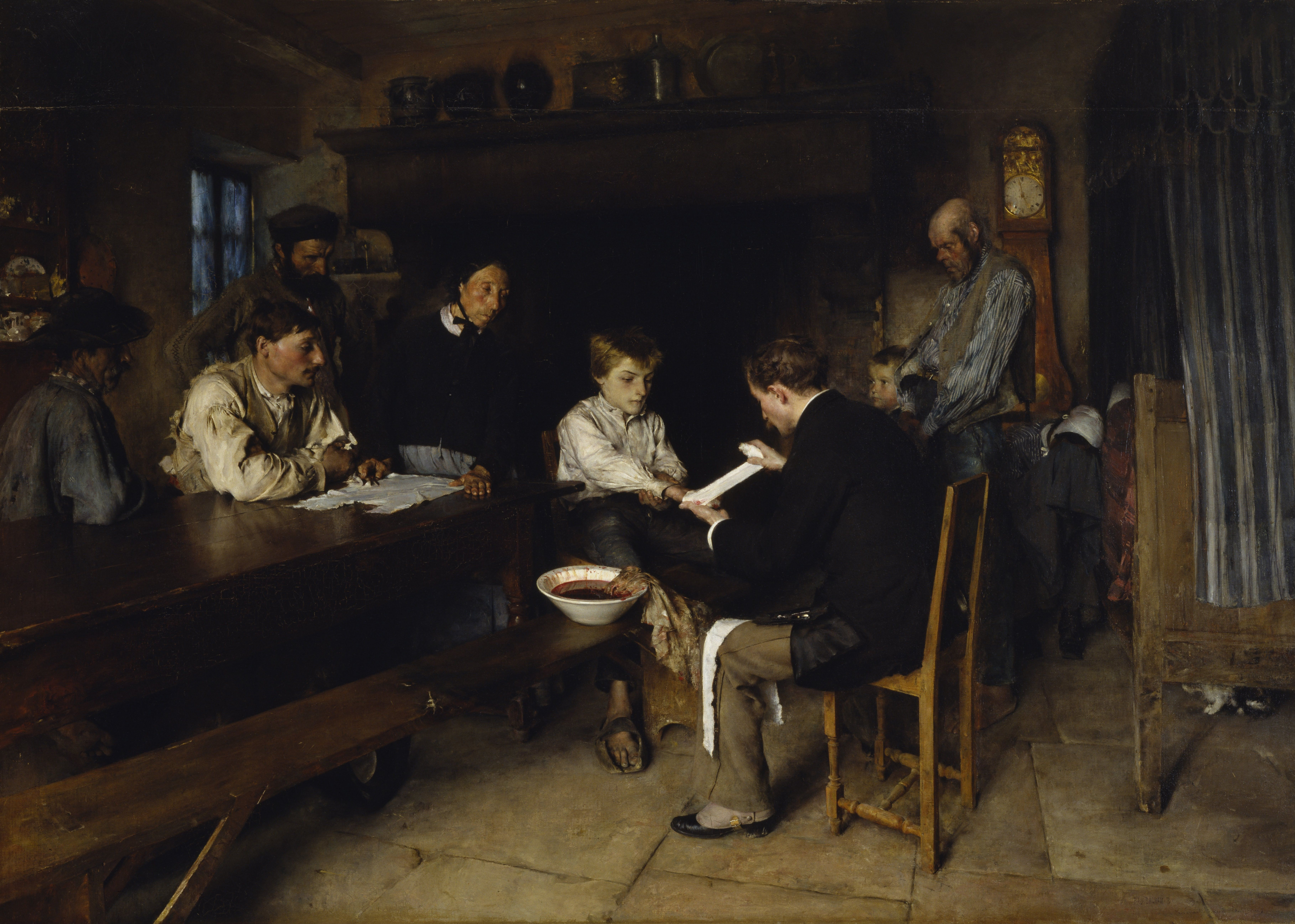
An Accident, 1879

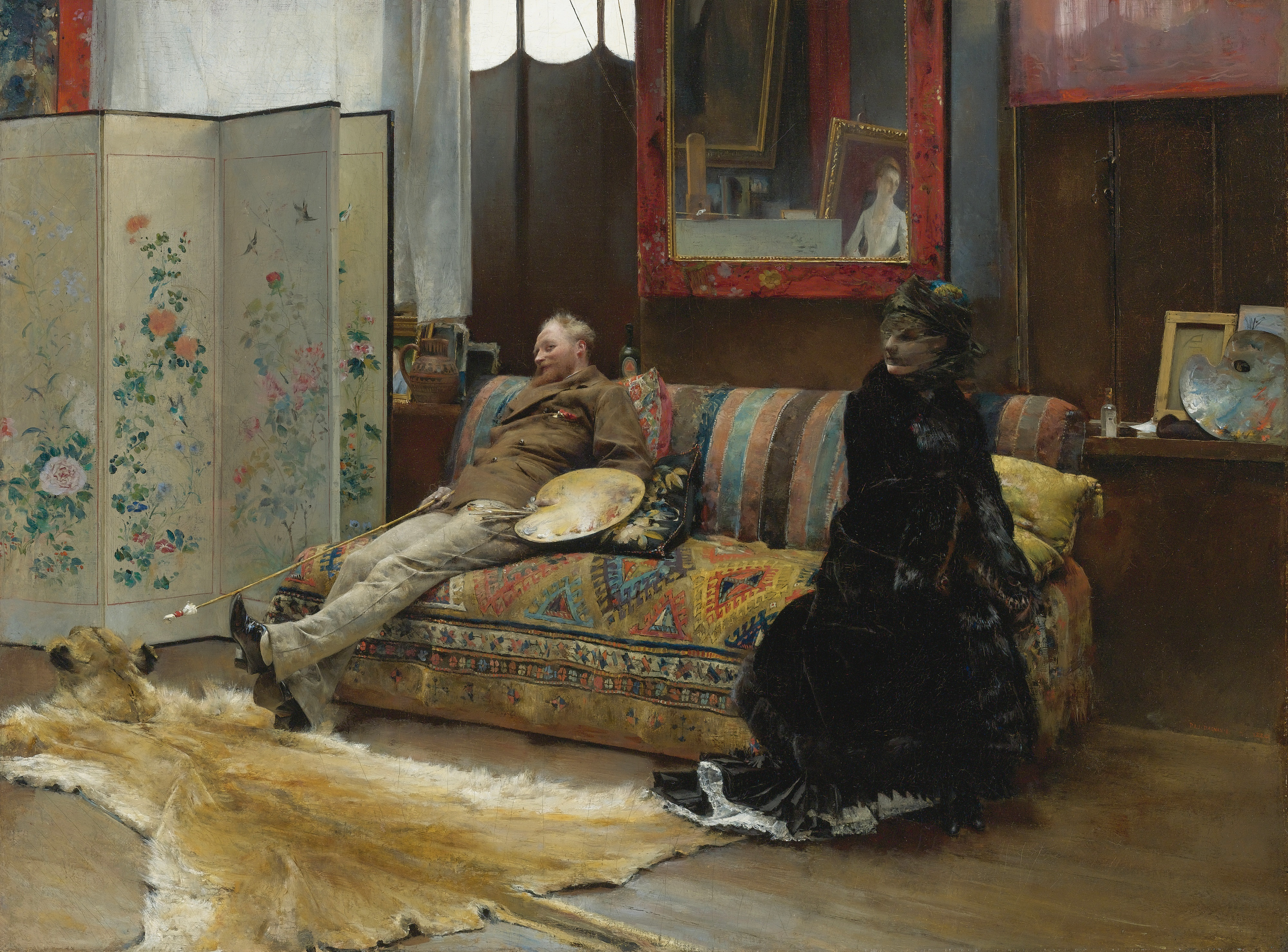
Sulking - Gustave Courtois in his studio, 1880

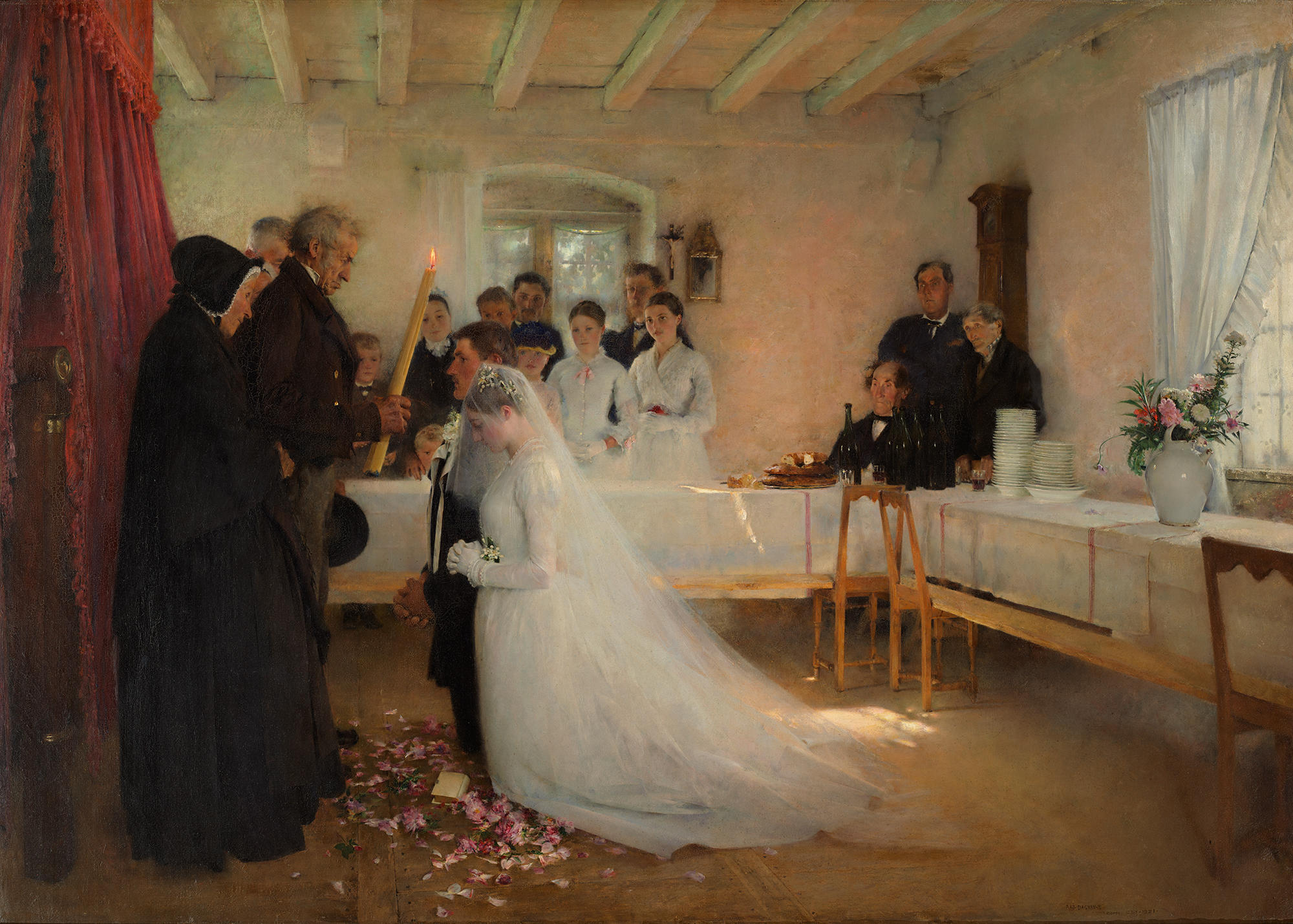
Blessing of the Young Couple Before Marriage, 1880–81

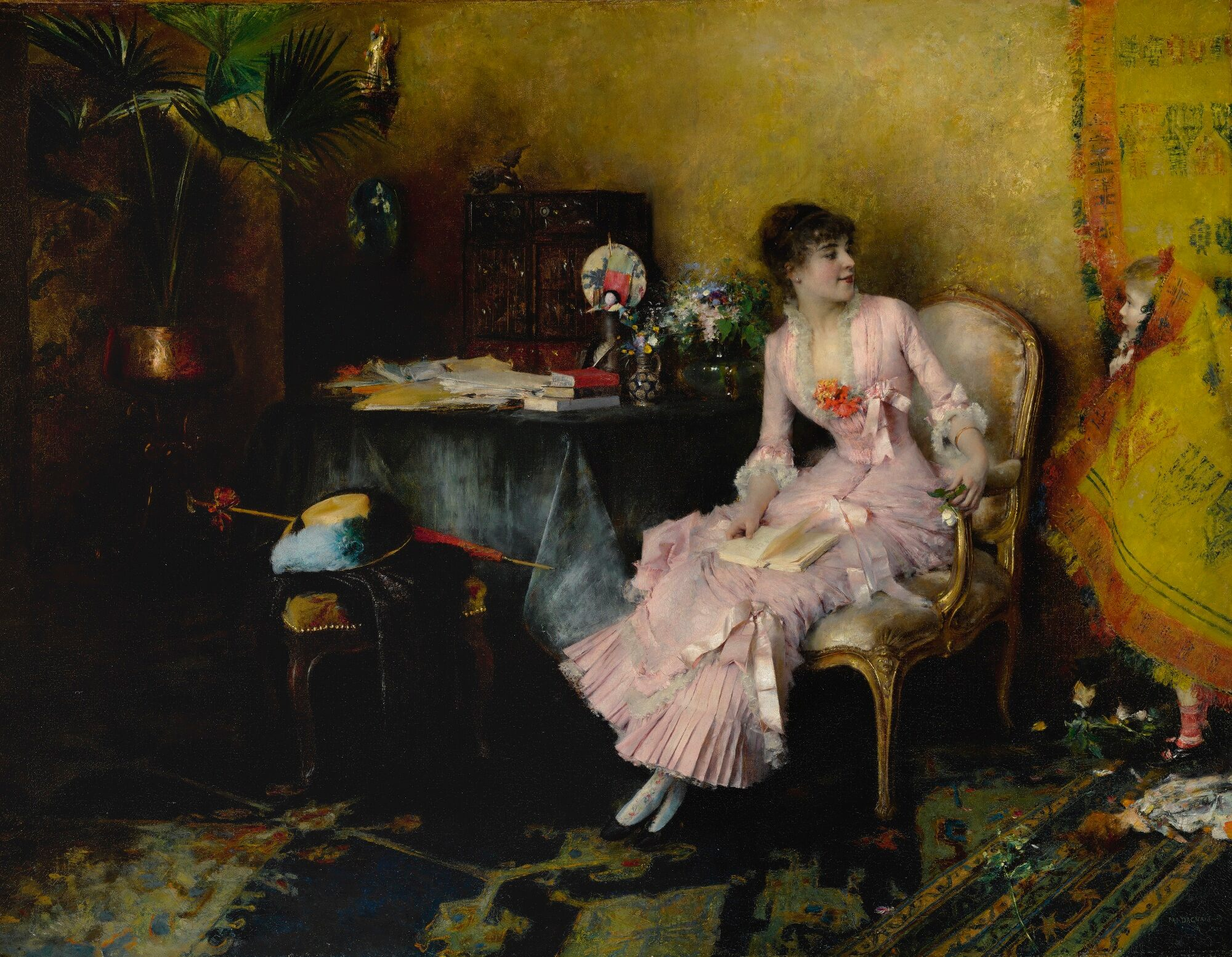
Young Woman in Pink with her Child, 1882

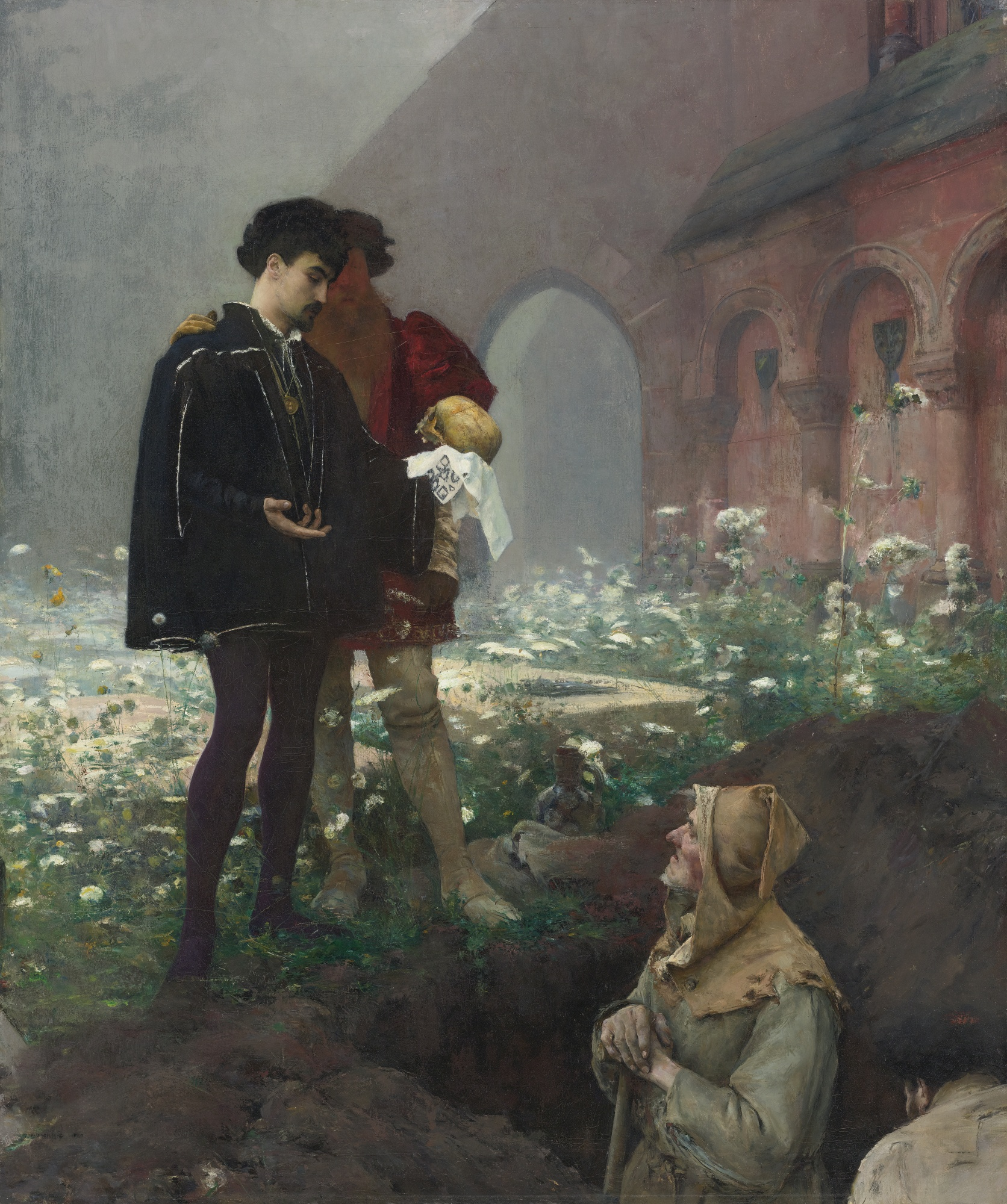
Hamlet and the Gravediggers, 1883

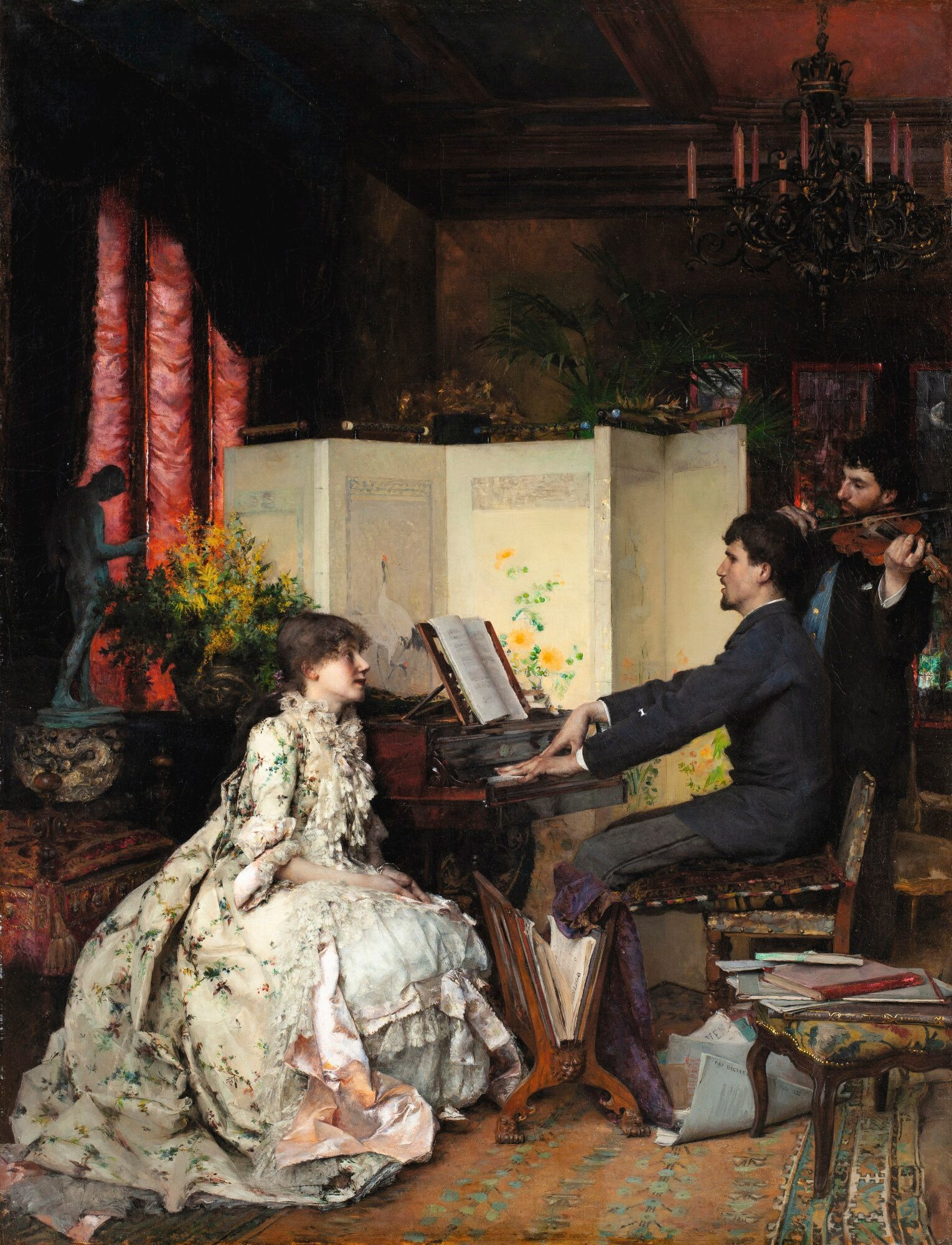
The Duet, 1883

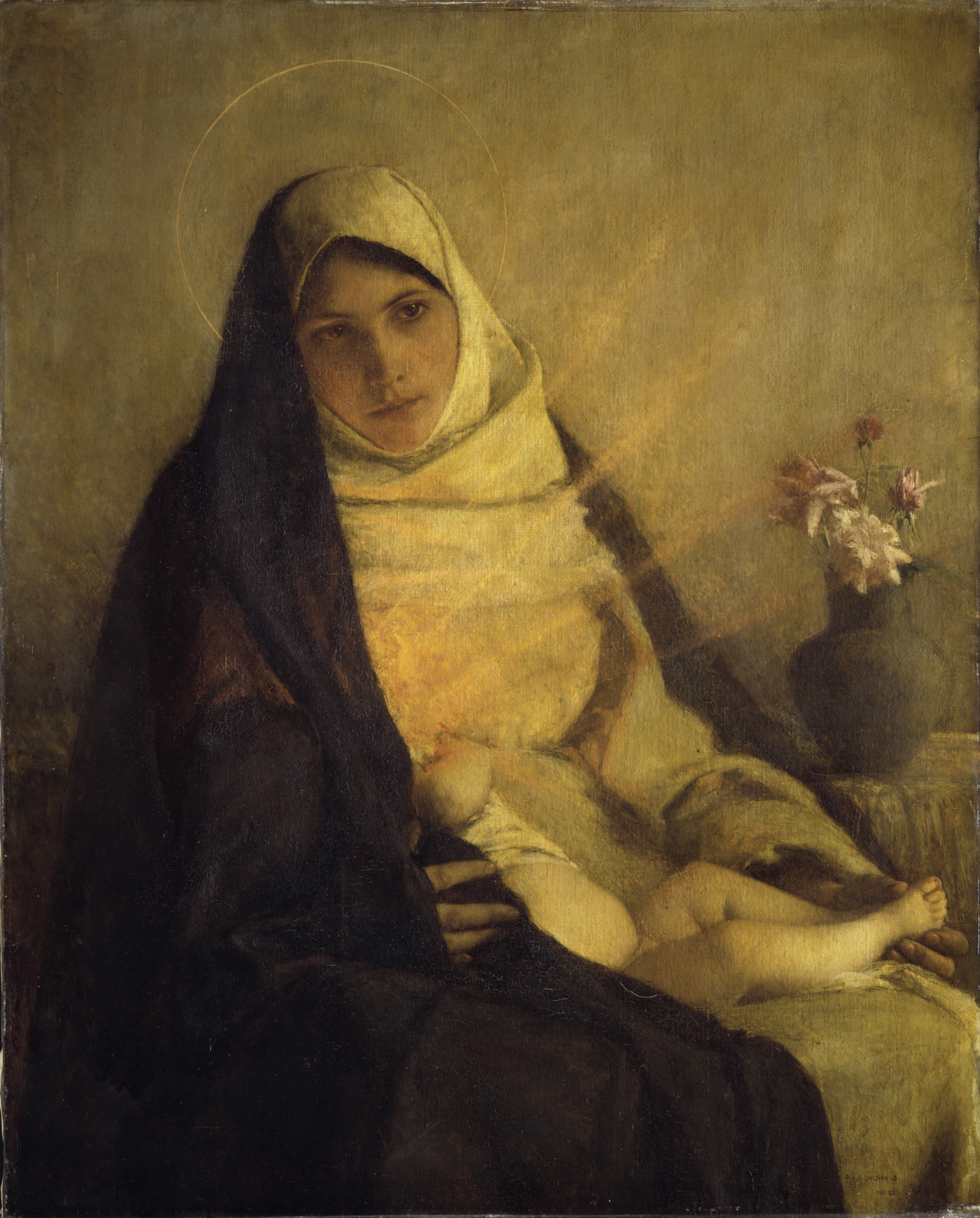
Madonna of the Rose, 1885

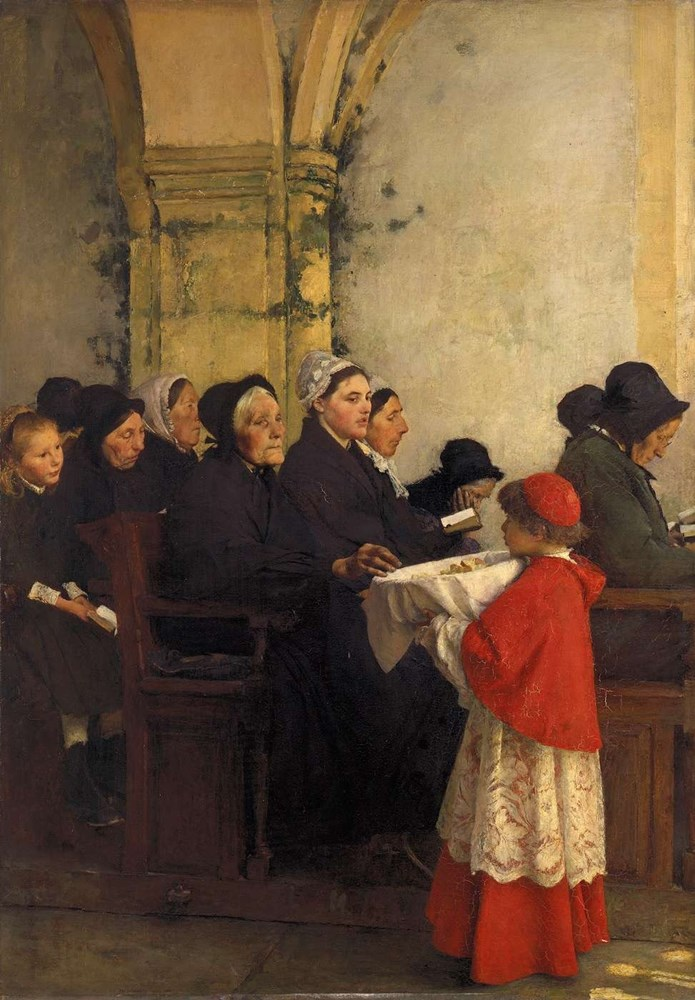
The Le Pain Bénit , 1885

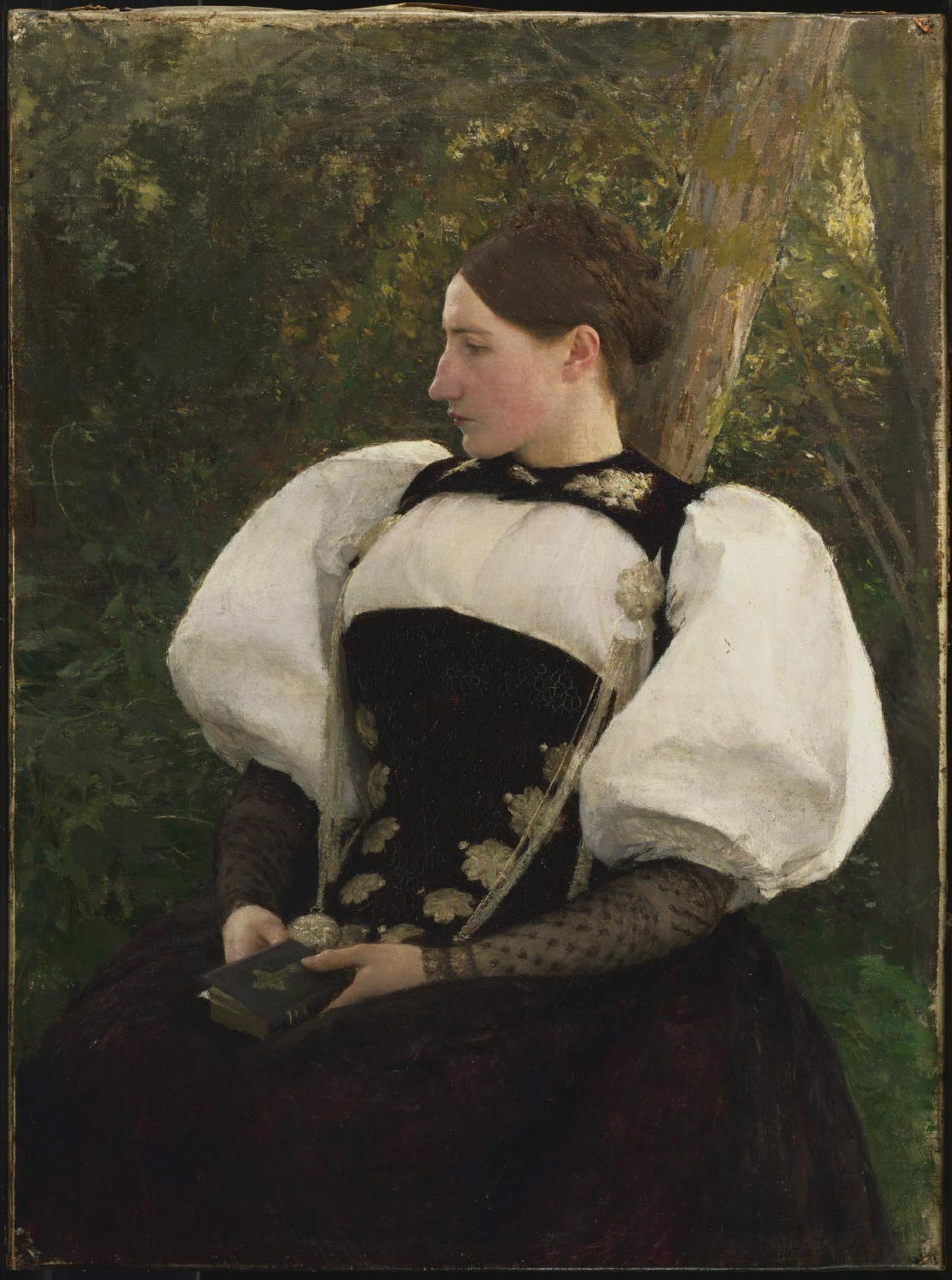
A Woman from Bern, Switzerland, 1887, portrait of the artist's wife

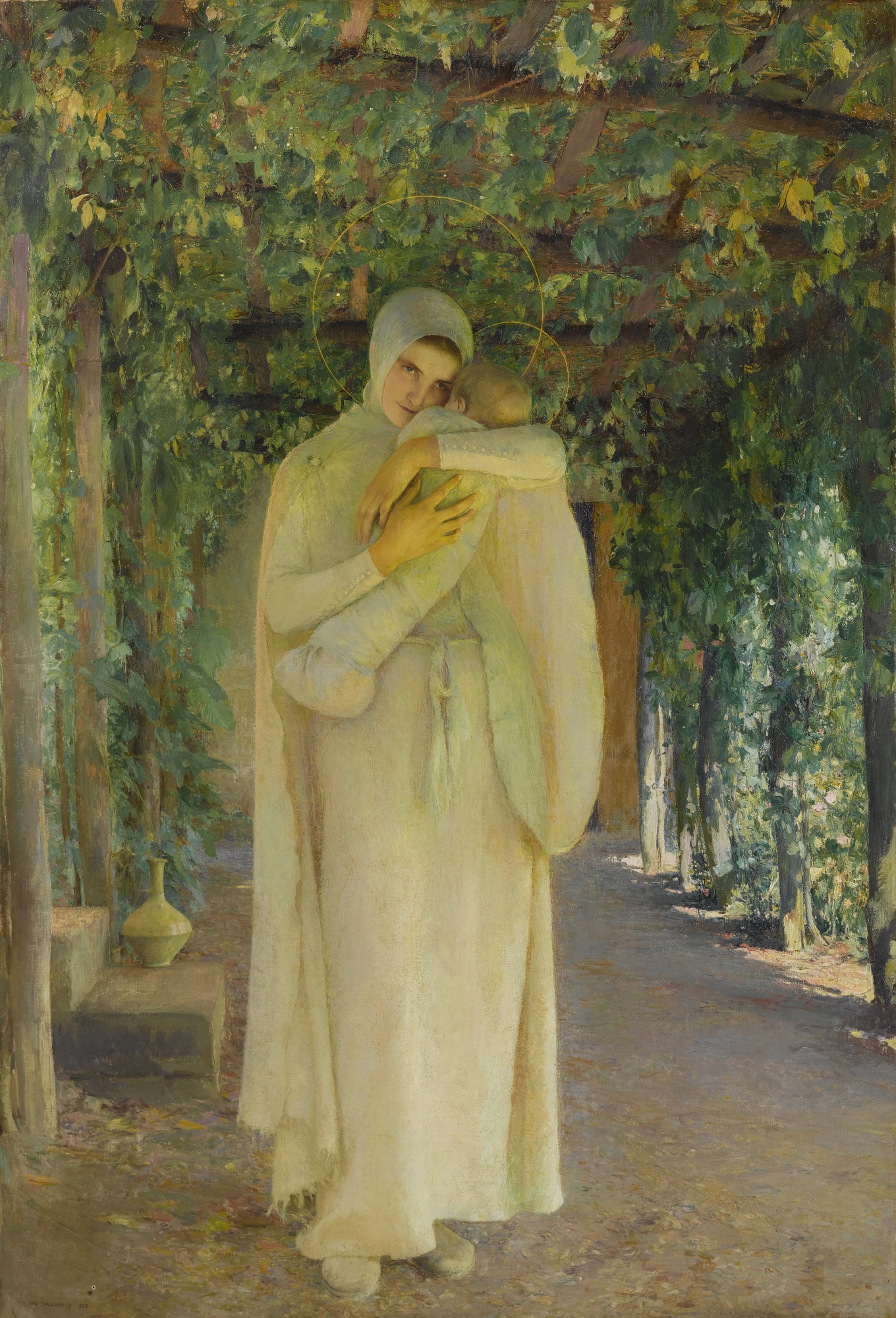
Madone À La Treille (Madonna of the Grapevine), 1888

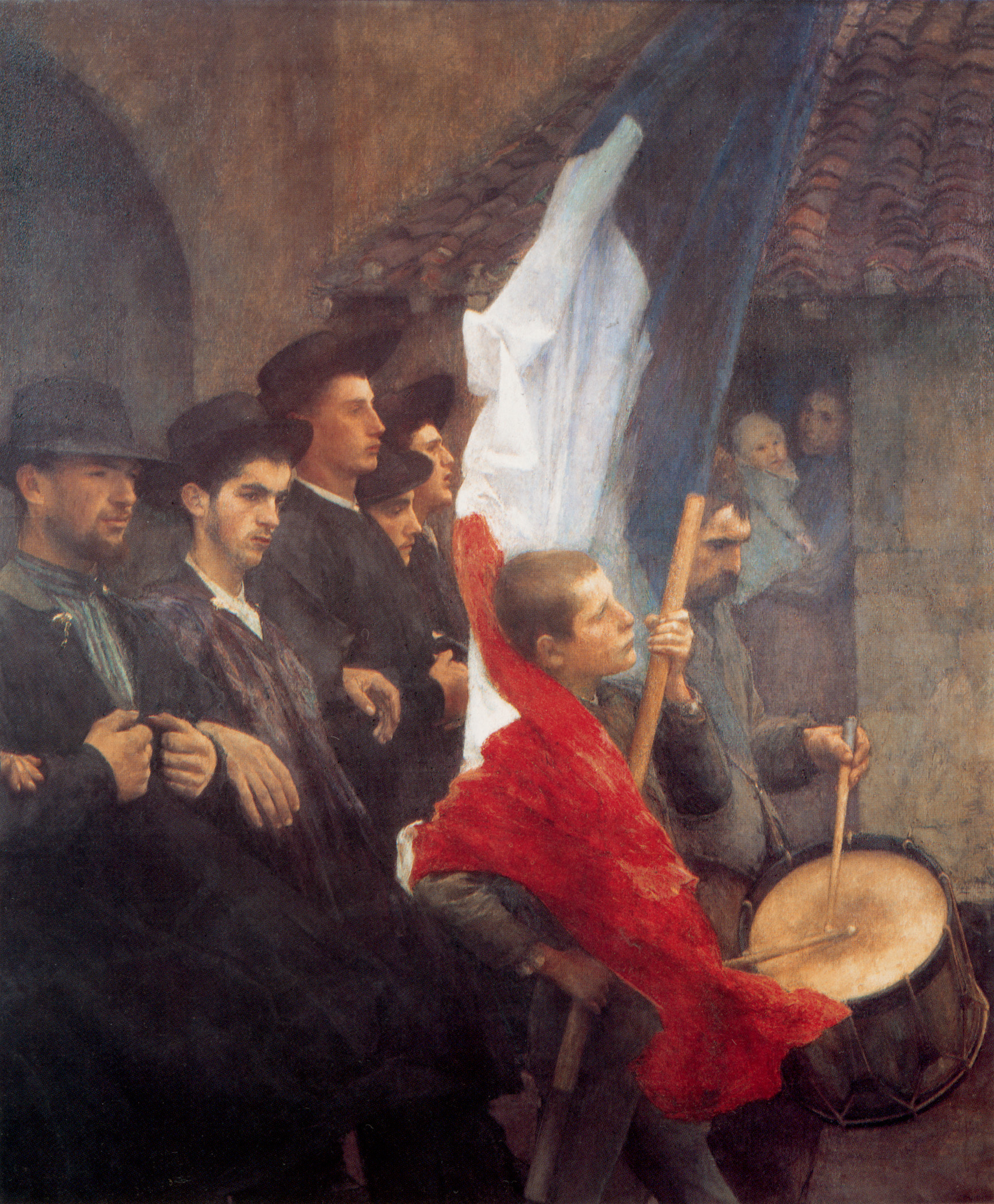
The Conscripts, 1889

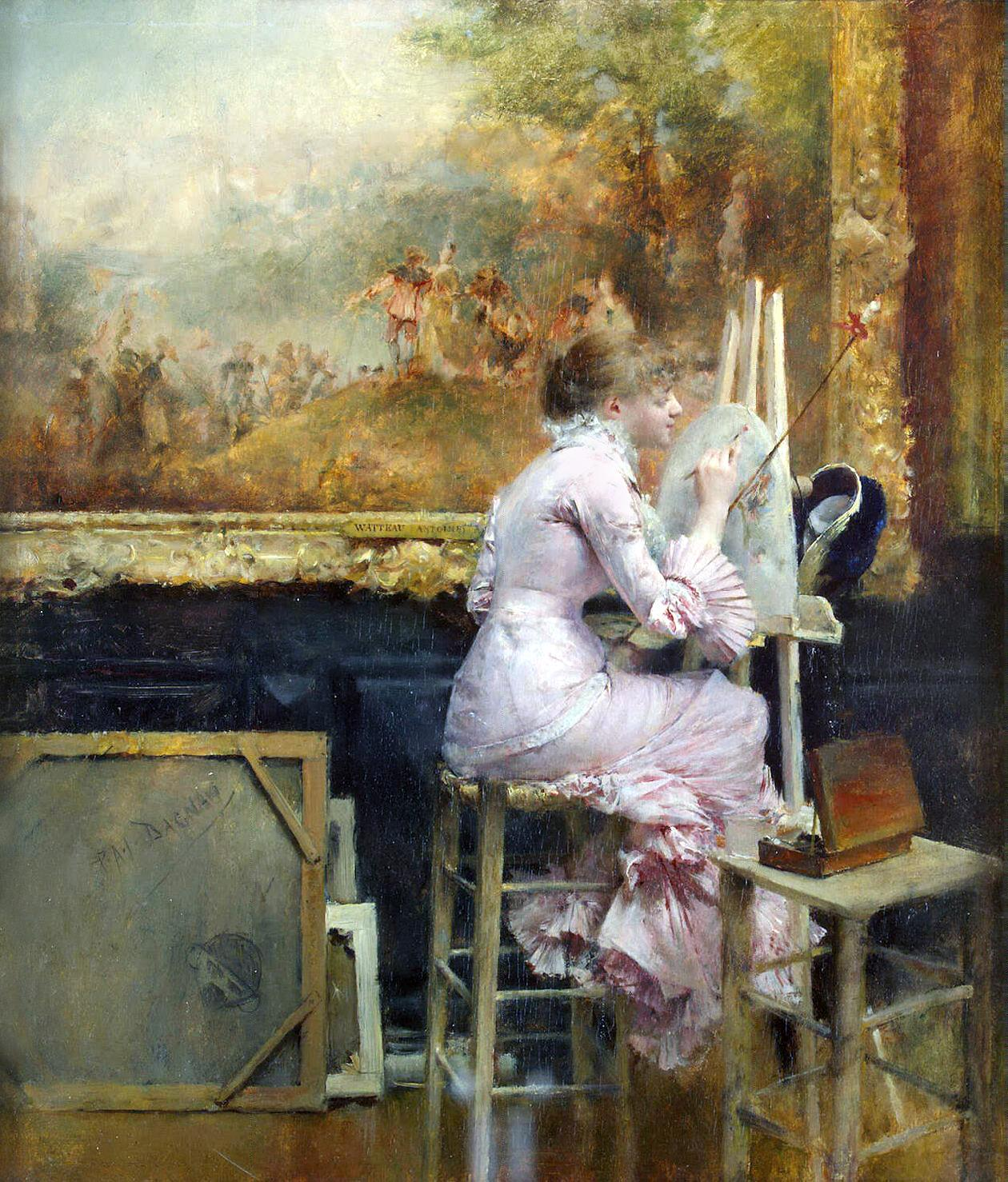
Watercolourist in the Louvre, c. 1889

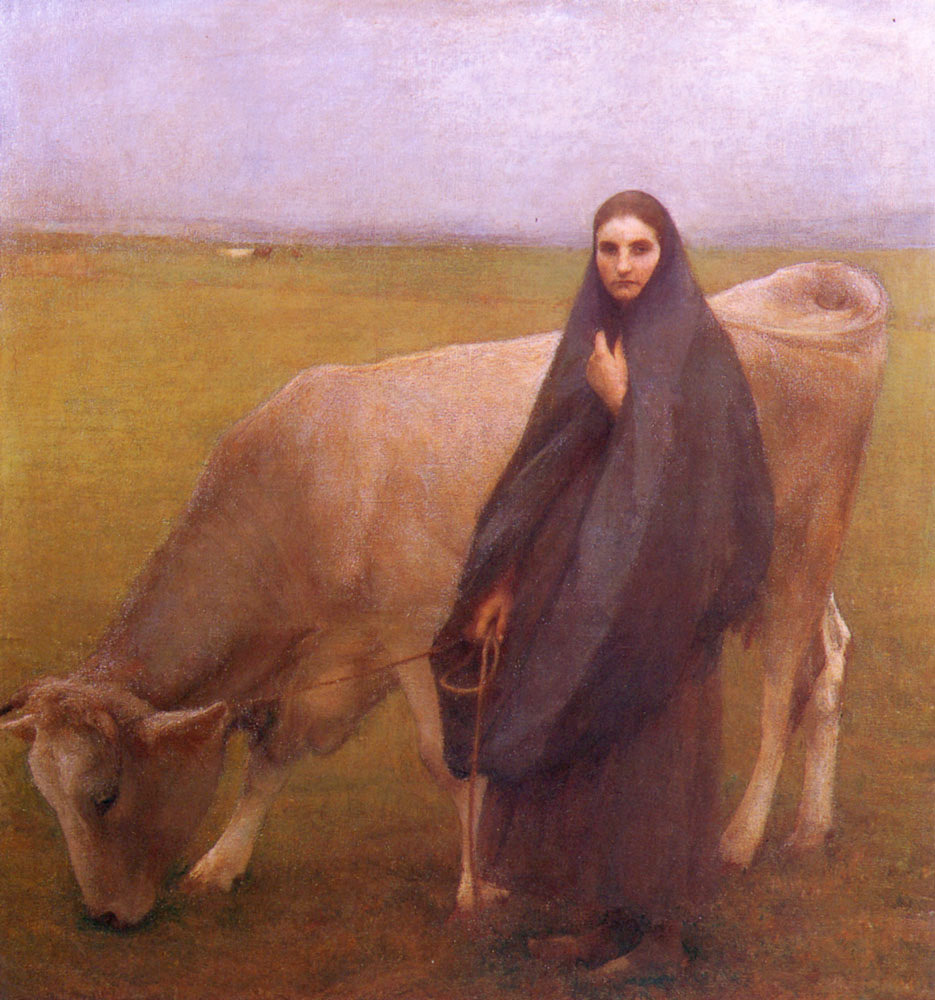
In the Meadow, 1892

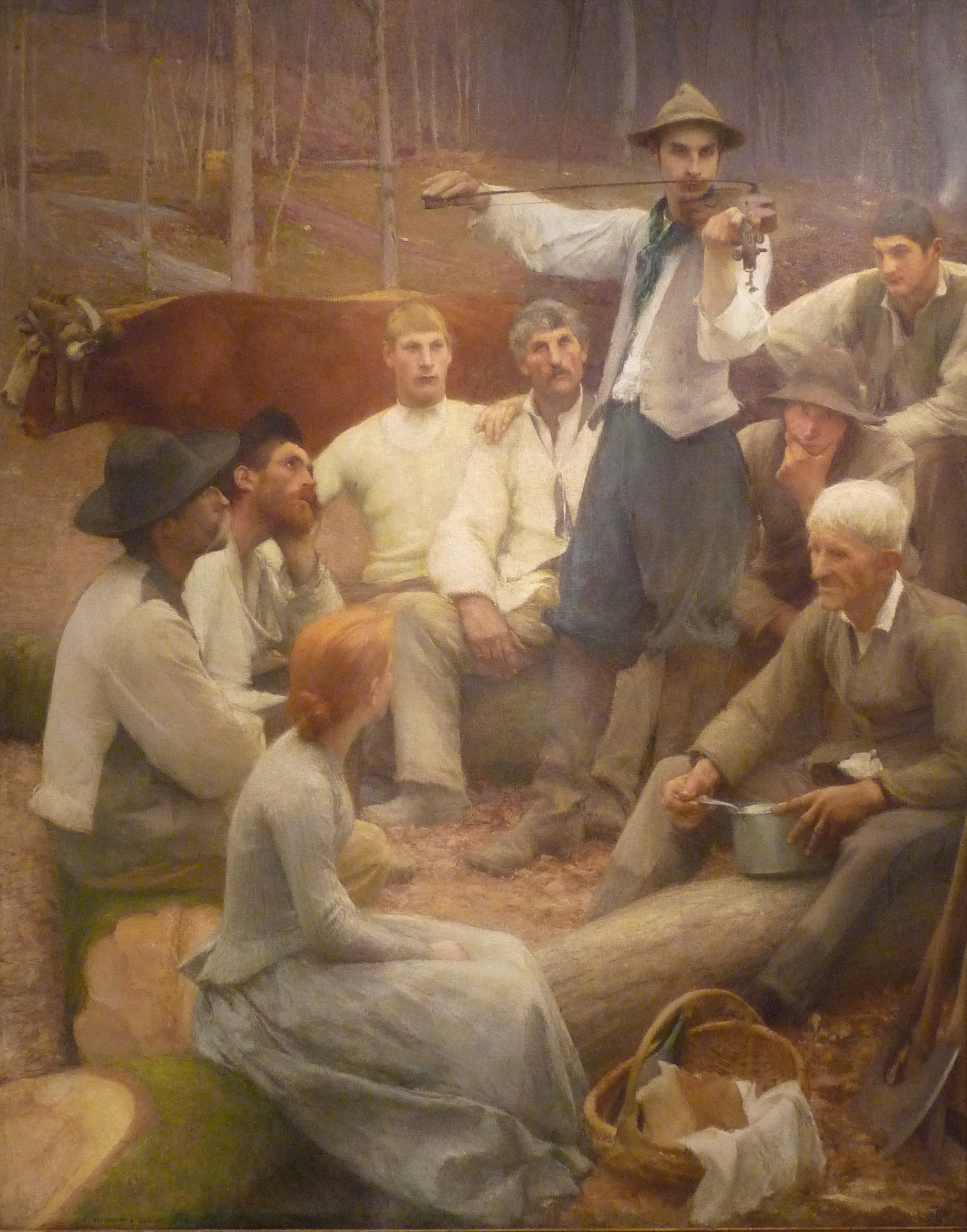
In the Forest, 1892

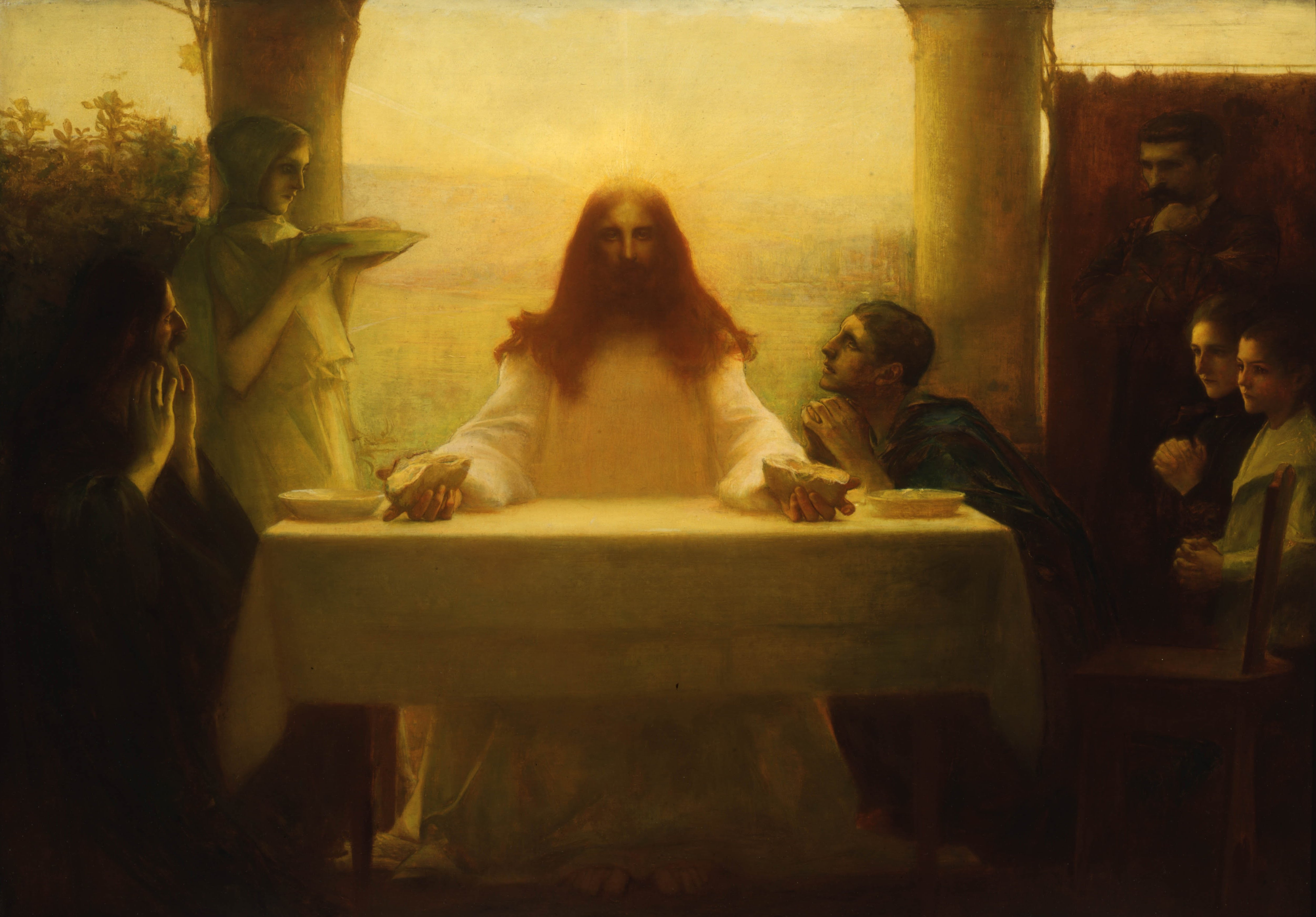
Christ and the Pilgrims at Emmaus, 1898

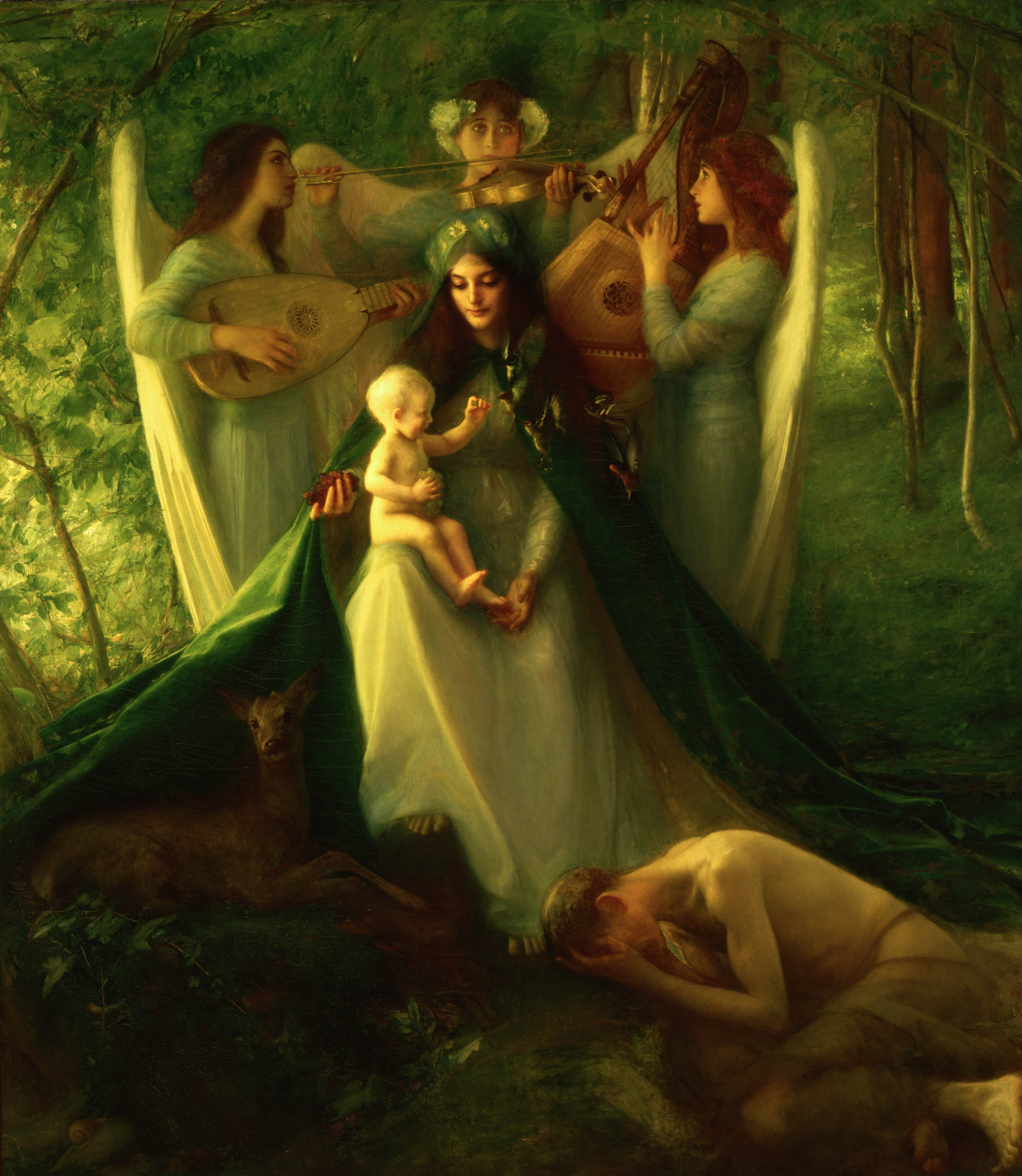
Consolatrix Afflictorium, 1899

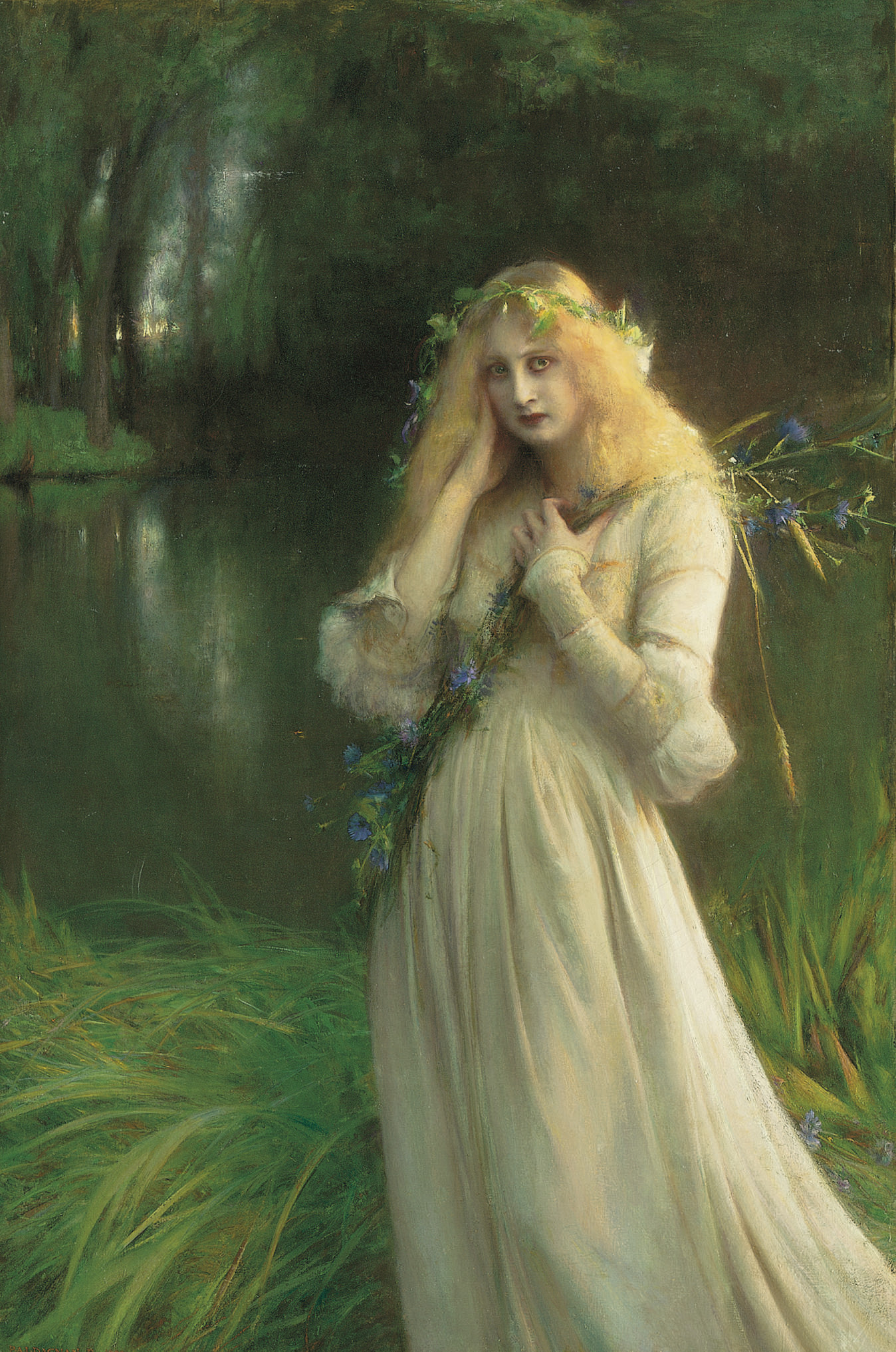
Ophelia, 1900

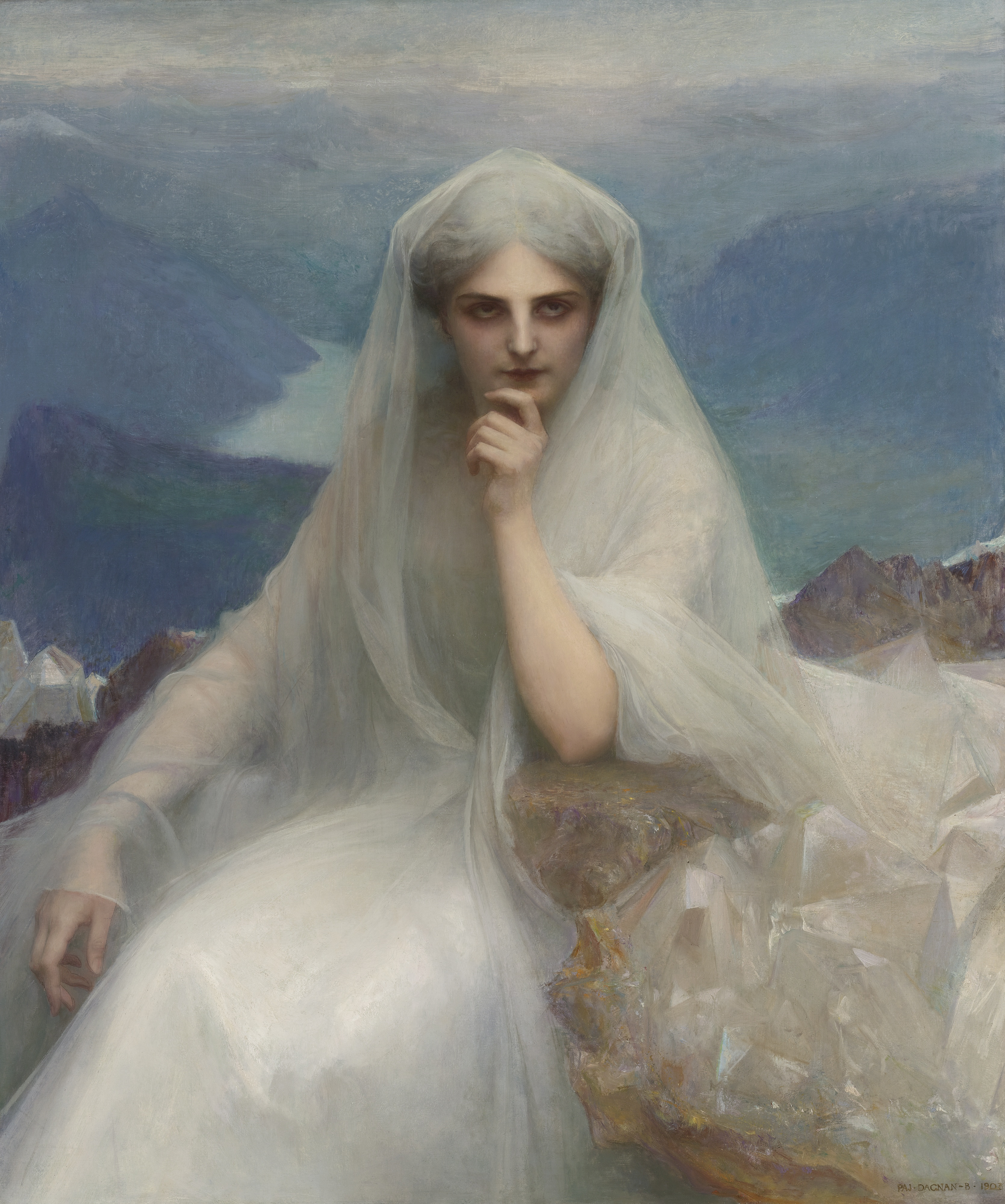
On the Summit, 1903

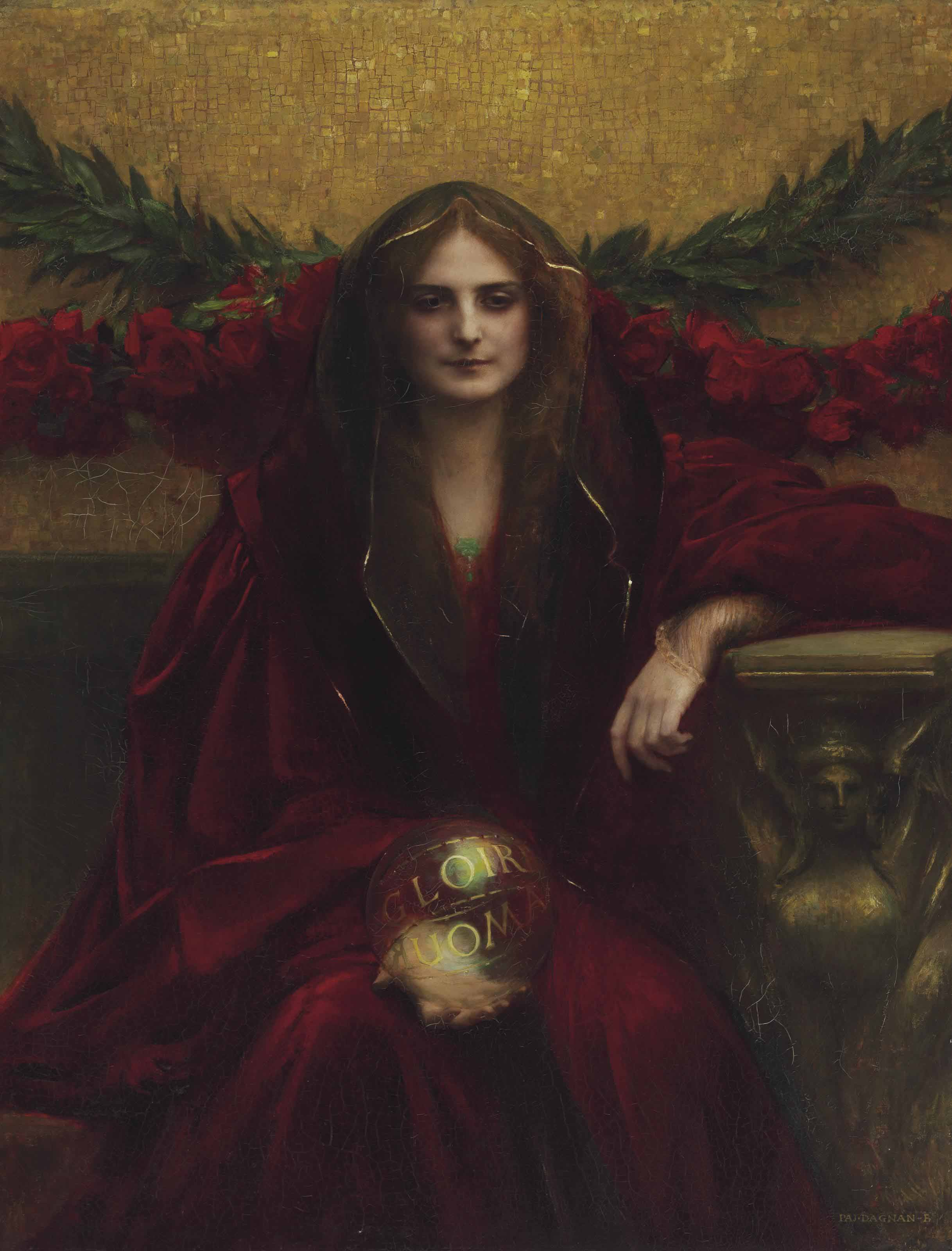
Chimères

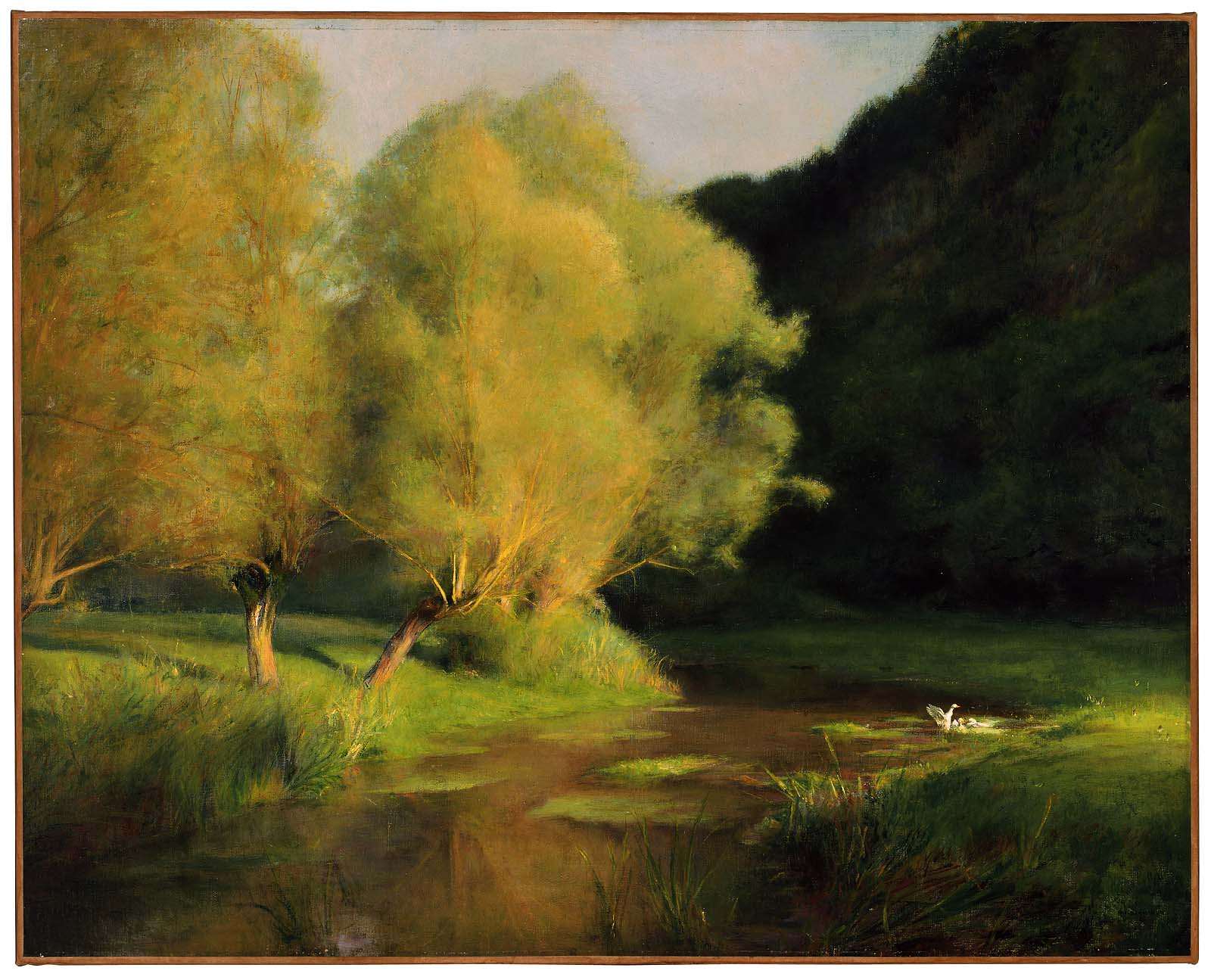
Willows by a Stream, 1908

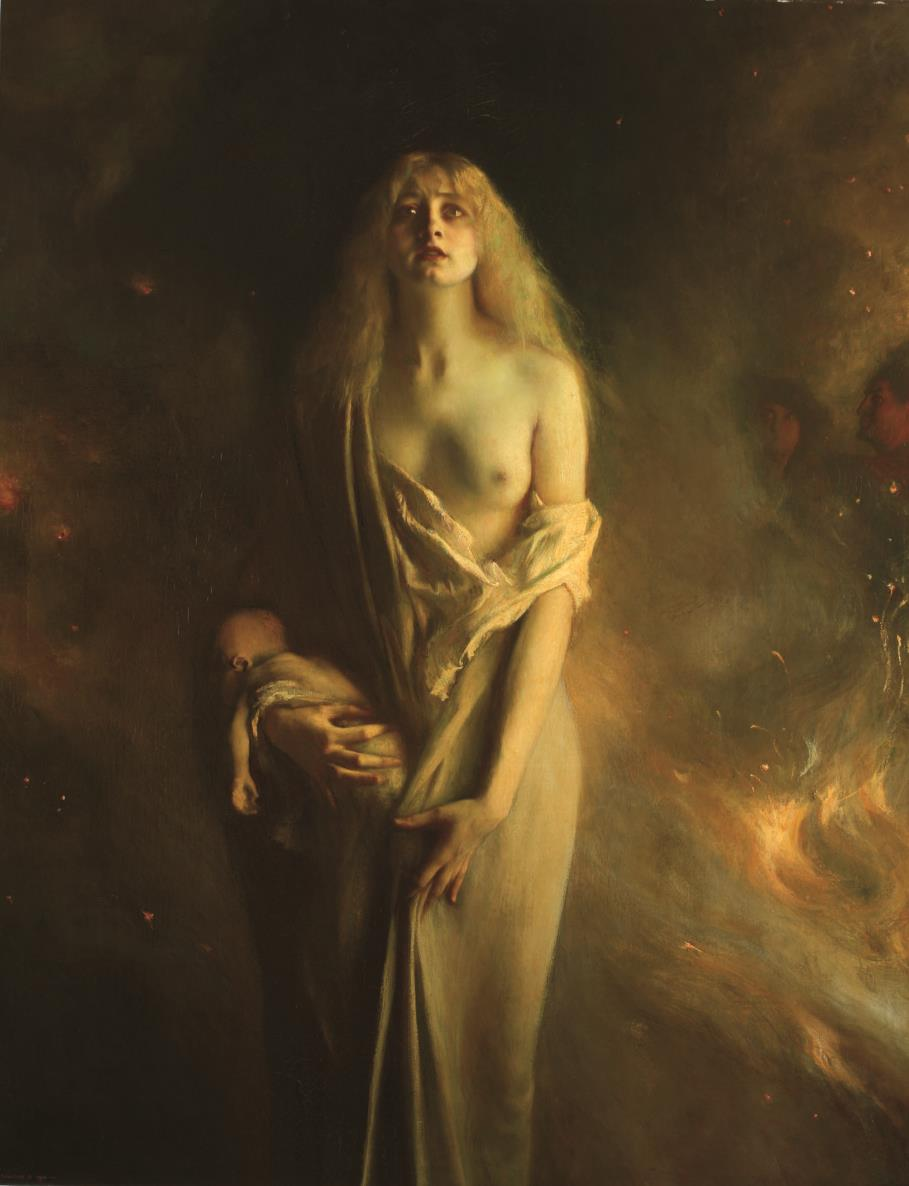
Marguerite au Sabbat, 1911

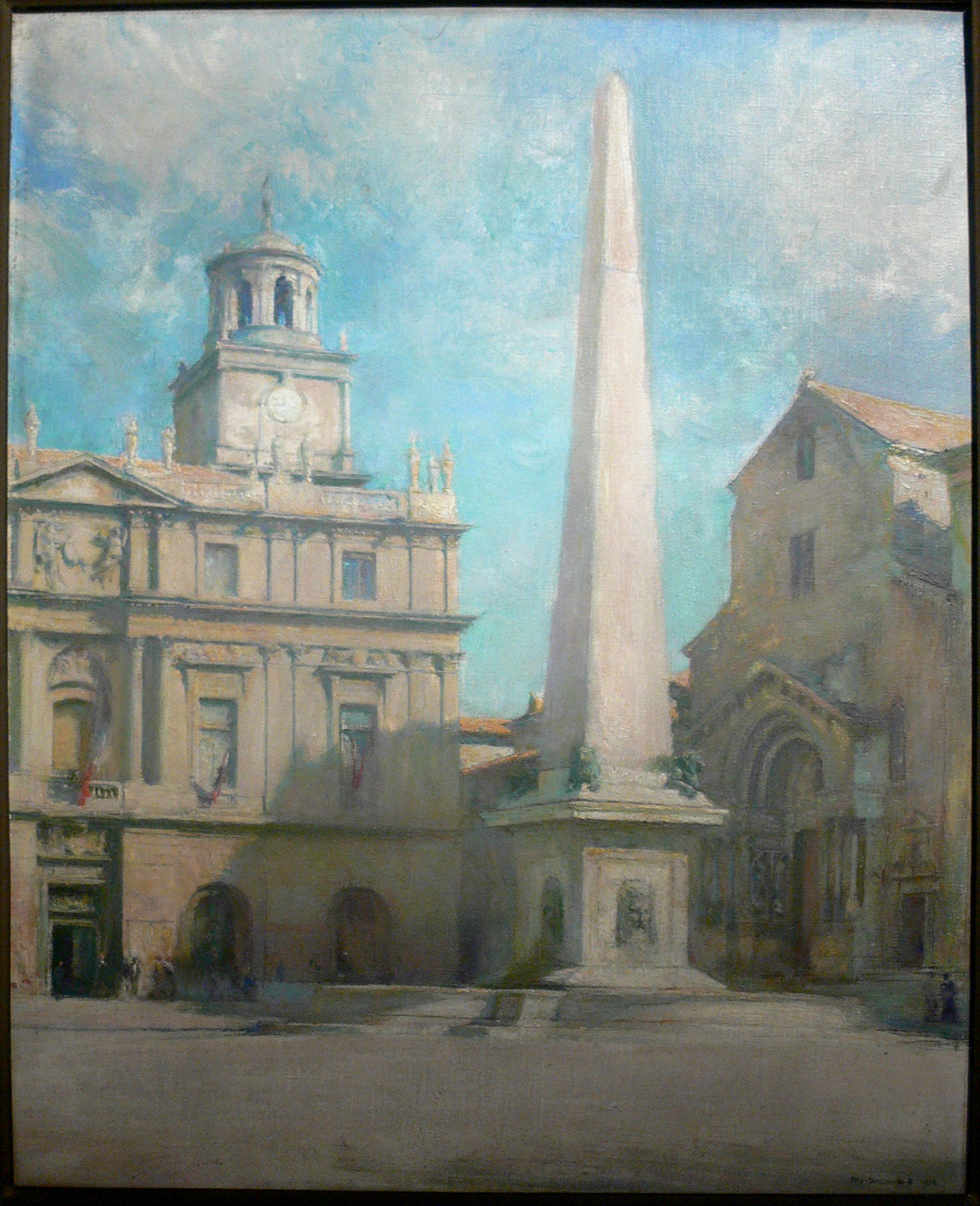
Saint-Trophime à Arles, 1914

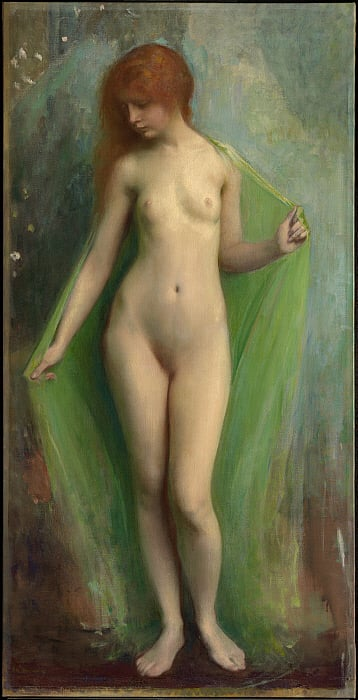
Primavera (1914), oil on canvas, 68 x 34 7/16 in. (172.7 x 87.5 cm), Clark Art Institute

== See also ==
- Sara Page (1855–1943), his student
