= Breton Women at a Pardon =

Painting by Pascal Dagnan-Bouveret

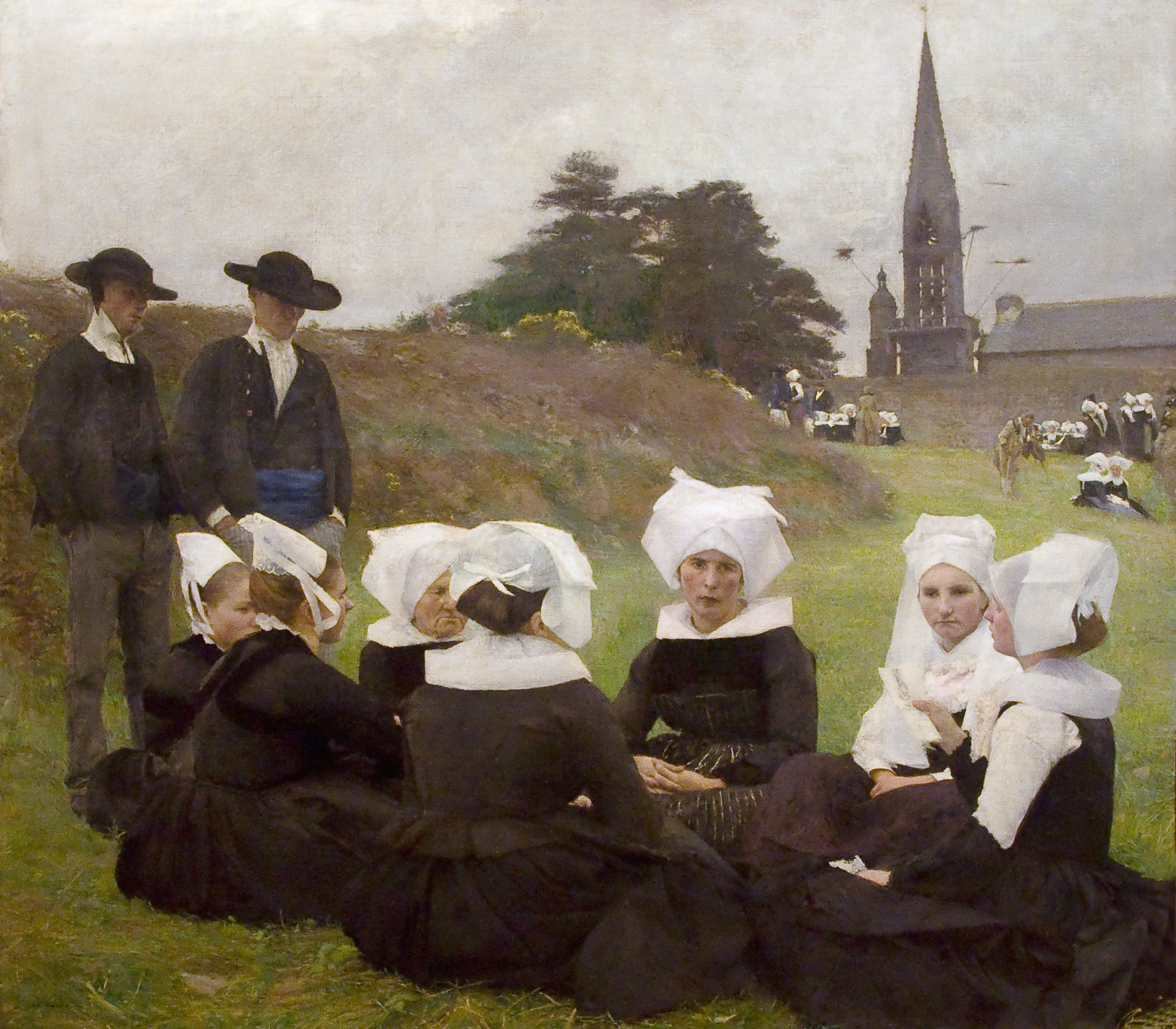
Pascal Dagnan-Bouveret, Les Bretonnes au Pardon, 1887. 125.1 x 141.1 cm., (49.3 in × 55.6 in), Museu Calouste Gulbenkian, Lisbon

Breton Women at a Pardon (French: Les Bretonnes au Pardon) is an 1887 oil on canvas by the French academic painter Pascal Dagnan-Bouveret. It shows seven women sitting on grass in a churchyard waiting for a ceremony to begin. The painting is composed of sombre tones, and the women have a serene calmness and a demeanour described as the embodiment of "simplicity and piety".

The women are dressed in traditional Breton costumes, which in the late 19th century would have been reserved for such an event: various starched white headdresses and collars worn over long, plain dark dresses. They are huddled in conversation while two men stand to their left with heads bowed, looking coyly at the women. The men have round black hats and are similarly dressed in black with white collars.

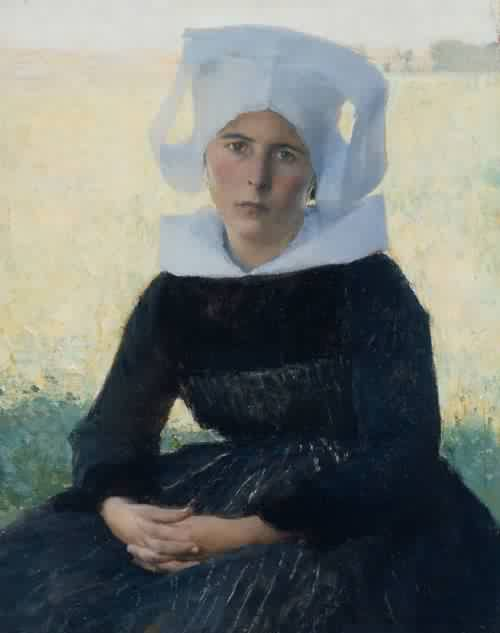
Woman in Breton Costume Seated in a Meadow, c 1887, an oil on canvas study for the central outward looking figure.

This work is the culmination of a series of Breton paintings and follows directly from the similar 1886 The Pardon in Brittany. It has a photorealistic look; Dagnan-Bouveret often used photographs as well as drawings and oil sketches when preparing for a finished canvas. There are many known photographic studies and drawings for both the Breton series in general and this work in particular. One photograph shows a grassy area in which the artist had a friend pose, and another a view of the church seen here in the background, complete with the festival flags protruding from the lower spire.

The vertical framing and almost uncomfortable proximity of the women add to its 'snapshot' aspect. From the photographs, the painting is known to have been posed at the Pardon de Rumengol, Finistère, Brittany.

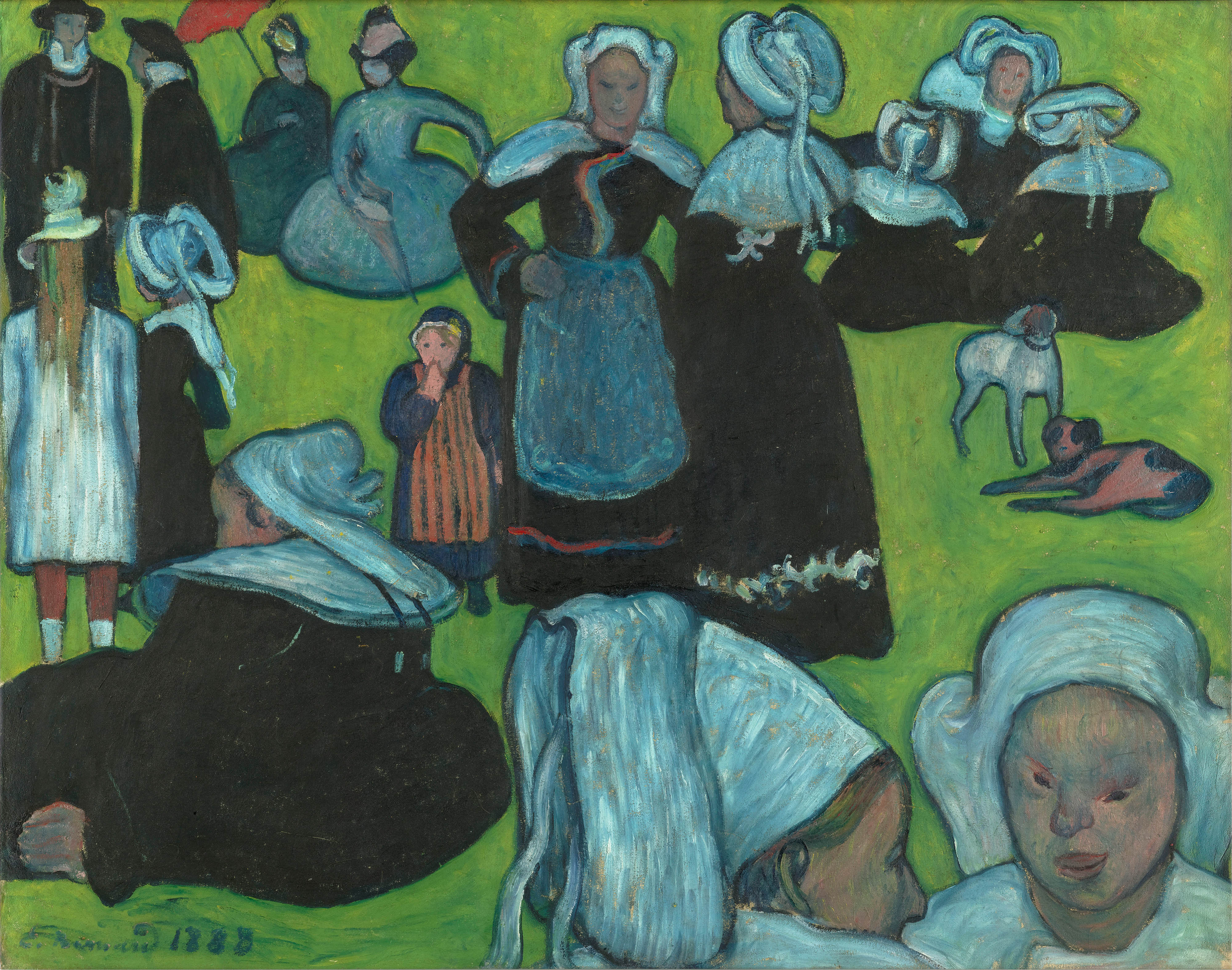
The Pardon. Émile Bernard, 1888

Breton Women at a Pardon was first exhibited at the Salon in 1889, where it drew acclaim and won the Grand Prise. It is often compared to Paul Gauguin's at the time controversial 1888 Vision After the Sermon and Émile Bernard's 1888 The Pardon (clearly inspired by Dagnan-Bouveret), as much for contrast in approach and in critical reaction, as for their thematic and compositional similarities. Gauguin and Bernard were seen as radicals at the time and disdained at the Salon.

== Gallery ==
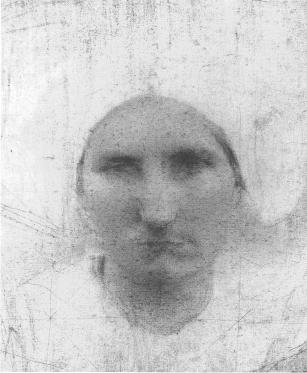
The 1887 study Head of a Woman in Breton Costume shows a working for the central woman who looks out at the viewer.

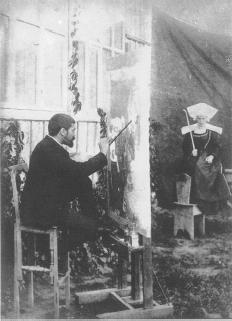
Photograph of Dagnan at his easel while his wife Walter poses in Breton costume. Taken in 1886

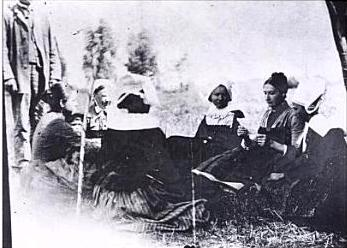
1887 photographic study of the group, including the standing men.

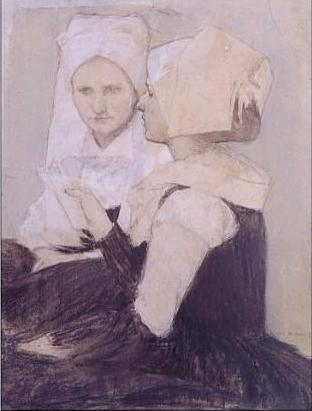
Study for Women at a Pardon, 1887. Black ink, pencil, charcoal. Sketch for the two women on conversation to the far right.

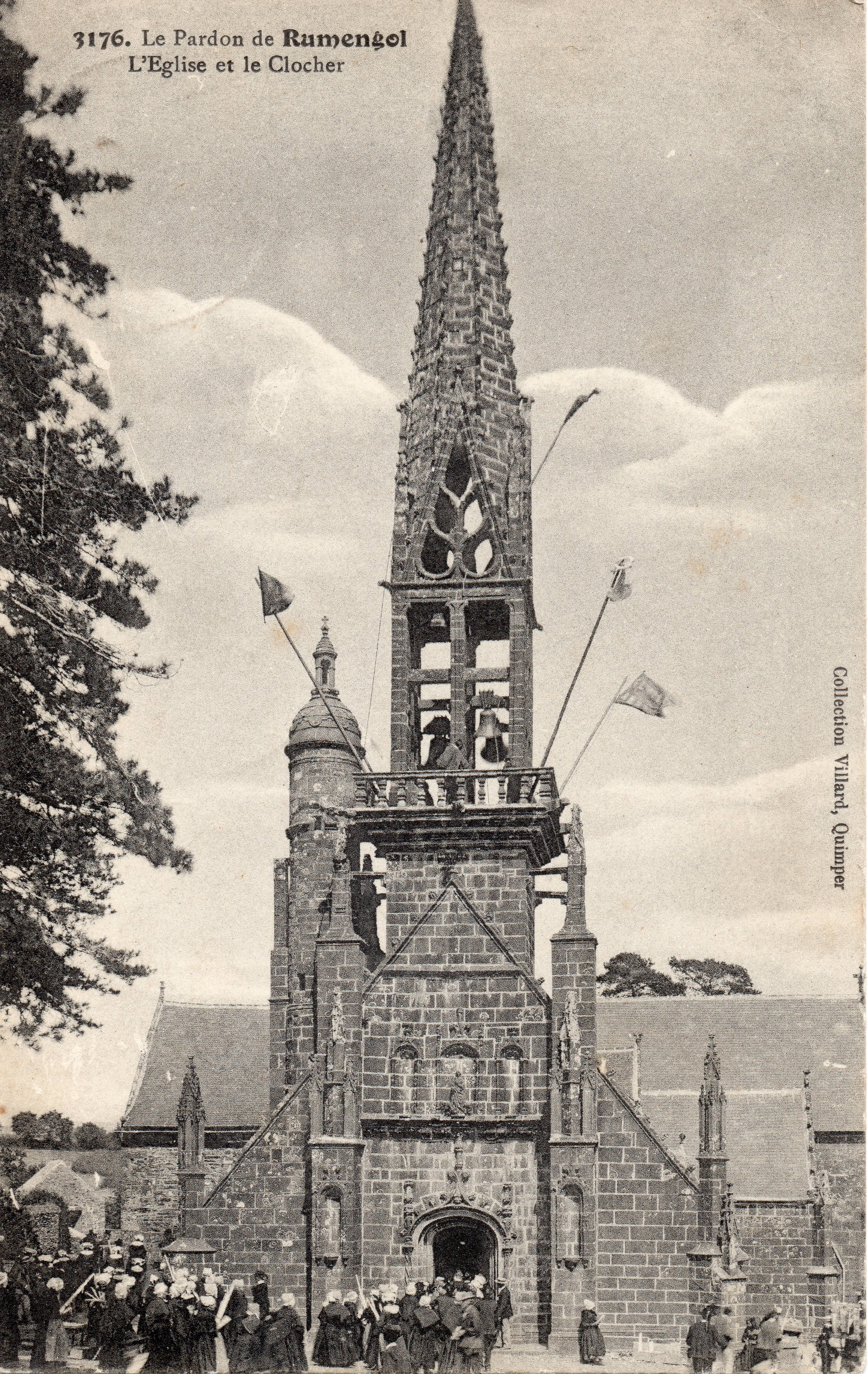
Le Pardon de Rumengol L'Eglise et le Clocher - Picture postcard showing the flags around the spire, used to give a festive look leading up to the pardon.
