= Sara Page =

British artist (1855-1943)

- Born: 1855; Moxley, Staffordshire, England
- Died: 1943 (aged 87–88); Parkstone, Dorset, England
- Education: Académie Julian

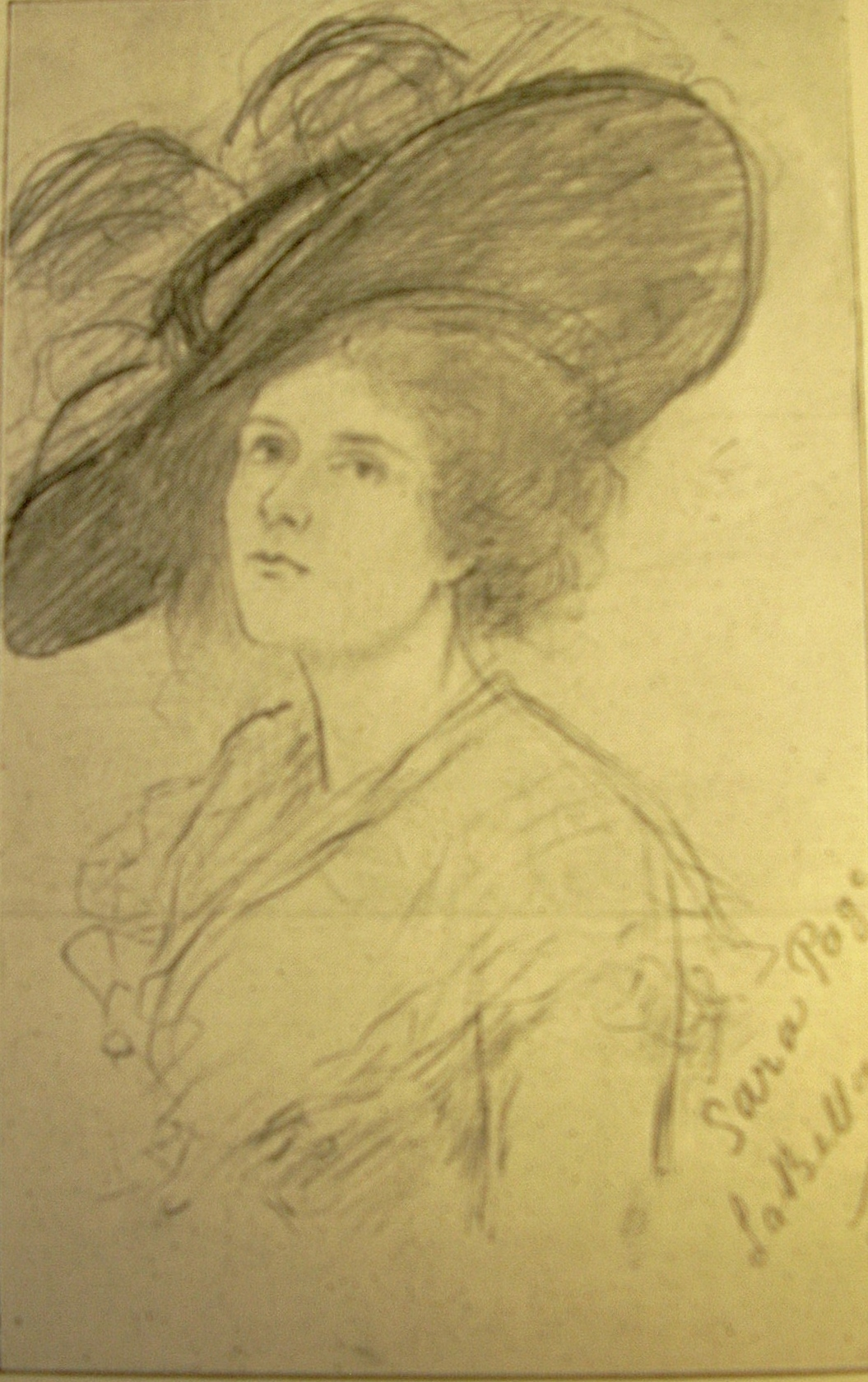
Sara Page, La Bella, 1902

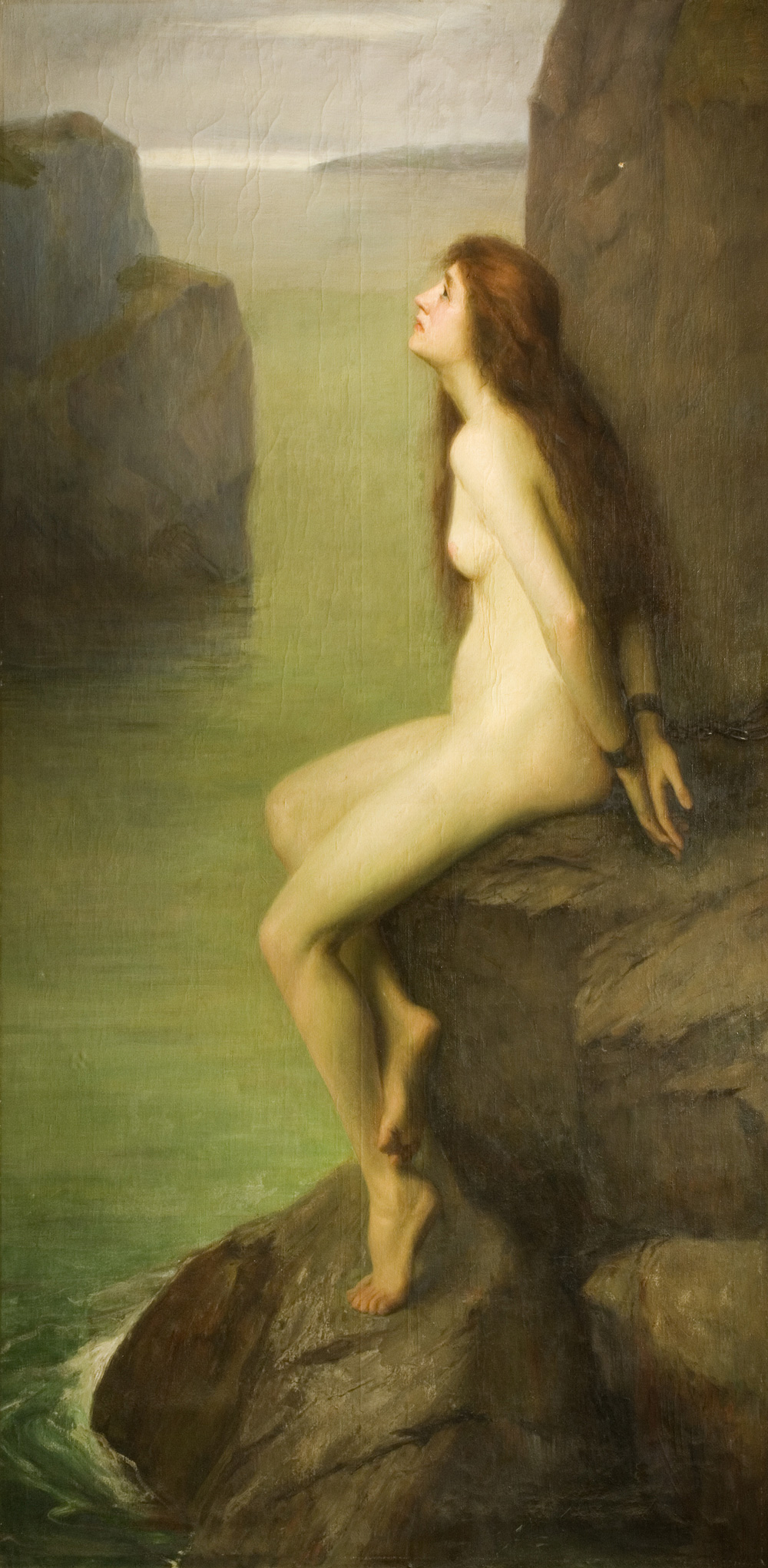
Sara Page, Andromeda, 1902, Wolverhampton Art Gallery

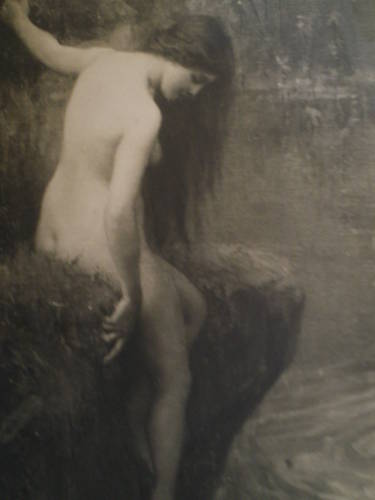
Sara Page, La baigneuse, 1911

Sara Wells Page (1855–1943) was a British artist, portrait and figurative painter, of the Victorian and Edwardian period. During her lifetime she was widely exhibited at Parisian salons and British galleries, including the Royal Academy of Arts. Three of her paintings are in Wolverhampton Art Gallery.

== Early life ==
Sara Page was born in 1855 in Moxley, Staffordshire, the fourth of nine children to a successful timber merchant, Samuel Page and Sara Wells Page, whose father Thomas Wells (1804–1876) was a wealthy local Ironmaster. Sam Wells Page, Sara's brother, was official receiver for Wolverhampton and Walsall and a solicitor in the Midlands. Both parents died in the 1870s, leaving to their children a considerable fortune, which helped them to live independently. Between 1884 and 1891, Page studied drawing at Wolverhampton School of Art, and then studied the works of Renaissance masters in Italy. In 1892, after returning from Italy, she exhibited at the Royal Birmingham Society of Artists a painting Golden Venetian.

== Paris ==
Sara Page arrived to Paris around 1892 and studied with William-Adolphe Bouguereau, Tony Robert-Fleury, and Gabriel Ferrier of the Académie Julian. She exhibited at the 1893 Société des Artistes Français (SAF) exhibition.

Page also exhibited at Paris Salon and the Royal Academy of Arts in London, which from 1892 through 1896 included portraits of members of her extended family. In the following years she continued to paint female portraits, such as: Beatrice (1899), Theodora (1903), Blondina (1914), Isobel (1915, 1916), Henriette (1935). Among other works, A Capri Maiden exhibited in Birmingham in 1894, and The Breton Peasant was shown in 1893–1894 at the Royal Birmingham Society of Artists. She received a medal for portrait painting.

In 1897 she settled in Neuilly-sur-Seine, a wealthy residential suburb of Paris with a strong artistic atmosphere, and maintained her own studio there. She took additional lessons from the well-established artists and leading exponents of the academic style Pascal Dagnan-Bouveret and Gustave-Claude-Etienne Courtois who also lived in Neuilly-sur-Seine, and had their studio at 73, Boulevard Bineau.

Her greatest success was the exhibiting the large-scale oil painting Andromeda at the Société Nationale des Beaux-Arts (SNBA) in 1902. In 1904 lived in Paris at 16, Avenue Niel and was identified as a miniature painter. Both Le rocher qui pleure (The Weeping Rock), exhibited in 1910, and Le Baigneuse (The Bather), exhibited in 1911 and 1935, are similar to Andromeda in style, composition, and technique. As such, they can be seen as good examples of the French academic style of Bouguereau, Dagnan-Bouveret, and Courtois.

From about 1909, Page studied with the miniature painter Gabrielle Debillemont-Chardon, the President of the Société des Femmes Peintres et Sculpteurs and of the Société des Miniaturistes et des Arts Precieux. In 1910, she participated in the exhibition of miniatures at the George Petit Gallery, showing a picture of Dutch children. Her miniature works exhibited in 1921 at the Gallerie Brunner, were favourably reviewed in the journal Revue moderne des arts and de la vie.

She exhibited at the Royal Academy, Walker Art Gallery, and Royal Birmingham Society of Artists. In 1926 she donated to Wolverhampton Art Gallery her 1902 painting Andromeda, in appreciation for the drawing instruction she received at the Wolverhampton School of Art. It was previously exhibited at the Paris Salon and its image was printed in Wolverhampton's Express & Star in January 1928.

== Later years ==
Page returned to England about 1934. Her last years were spent with her sister Elizabeth Page in Parkstone, Dorset, where she died in 1943. In the same year, her sister Elizabeth donated to Wolverhampton Art Gallery a small portrait The Princess, in memory of her sister. The painting Whisper of Spring was given to the gallery in 1977. A few of her works are at the Poole Museum.

== Legacy ==
Page is seen as a diligent artist who experimented with artistic techniques, followed established academic tradition, and was an exponent of the academic style in England. She did not develop a prominent professional career, but she was an example of a woman from the late 19th- and early 20th-century who sought and acquired education, self-expression and an independent career.

== Works ==
She exhibited the following works of art:

- A Golden Venetian, 1892
- Une Reve, 1892
- Elsie, 1892
- Miss Ellen Wells, 1893, private collection
- Portrait de Mlle E.P., 1893
- Mada, pastel, 1893
- Une paysanne bretonne, pastel, 1893
- A Capri Maiden, watercolour, 1894
- Study of Fruit, oil, 1894
- A Breton Peasant, oil, 1894
- Une reponse attendue, 1894
- Innocence, 1895
- Harmony in Blue, 1896
- Portrait de Mlle K…, pastel, 1896
- Juin, pastel, 1896
- La Marquise, pastel, 1897
- Beatrice, pastel, 1897
- Violettes, 1900
- The Princess, painting, 1901, Wolverhampton Art Gallery
- Andromeda, oil, 1902, Wolverhampton Art Gallery
- Frame containing 2 miniatures
- La Bella, drawing, 1902
- Theodora, 1903
- The Lace Maker, 1903
- Reflection, 1906
- La Marquise, drawing, 1906
- Spring, 1906
- The Whisper of Spring, oil, c. 1906–1910, Wolverhampton Art Gallery
- Le Rocher qui pleure (The Weeping Rock), oil, 1910
- Le marquis, drawing, 1910
- The Dutch Children, c. 1909
- La Baugneuse (The Bather), oil, 1911
- La faunesse, drawing, 1911
- La liseuse (Reading Woman), 1912
- L'écharpe rose (The Rose Scarf), drawing, 1912
- Jeune fille de France, miniature, 1912
- The Rose Scarf, 1913
- Louise, miniature, 1914
- Blondina, 1914
- Isobel, 1915
- A la fontaine, 1920
- L'Emir, 1921
- Le Bonnet blanc, 1921
- Charlotte, 1921
- La chale jaune, miniature, 1925
- Solitude, miniature, 1925
- Storm Clouds, 1934
