= Edward Douglass White =

Chief Justice of the United States from 1910 to 1921

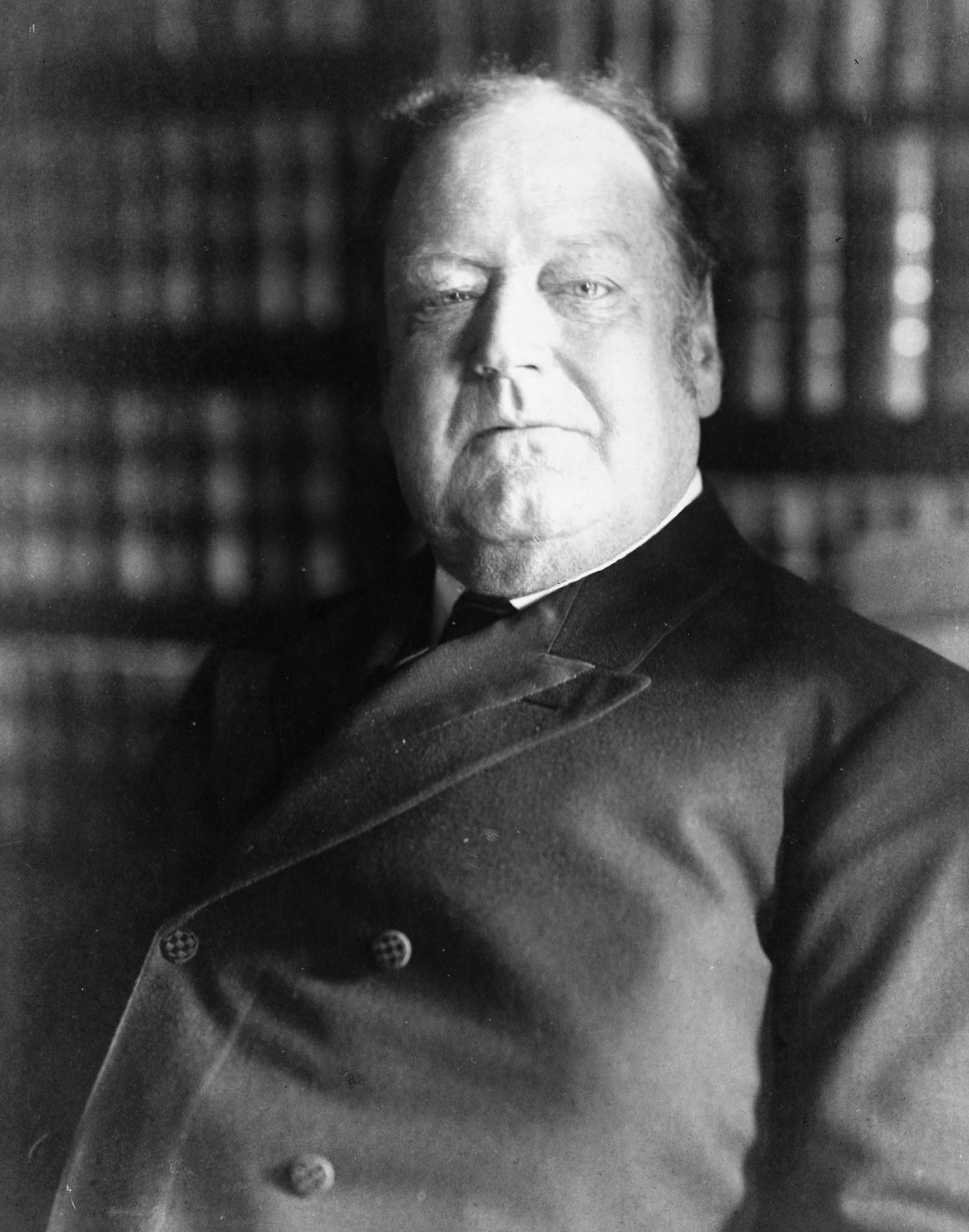
- White in 1905

9th Chief Justice of the United States
- In office December 19, 1910 – May 19, 1921
- Nominated by: William Howard Taft
- Preceded by: Melville Fuller
- Succeeded by: William Howard Taft

Associate Justice of the Supreme Court of the United States
- In office March 12, 1894 – December 18, 1910
- Nominated by: Grover Cleveland
- Preceded by: Samuel Blatchford
- Succeeded by: Willis Van Devanter

United States Senator from Louisiana
- In office March 4, 1891 – March 12, 1894
- Preceded by: James Eustis
- Succeeded by: Newton Blanchard

Justice of the Louisiana Supreme Court
- In office January 1879 – April 1880
- Nominated by: Francis T. Nicholls
- Preceded by: William B. Giles Egan

Personal details
- Born: Edward Douglass White Jr. November 3, 1845 Thibodaux, Louisiana, U.S.
- Died: May 19, 1921 (aged 75) Washington, D.C., U.S.
- Resting place: Oak Hill Cemetery
- Party: Democratic
- Spouse: Leita Montgomery Kent (m. 1894)
- Education: Mount St. Mary's University (AB); Georgetown University; Tulane University (LLB)

Military service
- Allegiance: Confederate States of America
- Branch/service: Confederate States Army
- Rank: Lieutenant
- Unit: 9th Louisiana Cavalry Regiment (Confederate)
- Battles/wars: American Civil War

Edward Douglass White Jr. (November 3, 1845 – May 19, 1921) was an American politician and jurist who served as an associate justice of the Supreme Court of the United States from 1894 to 1910 and as the ninth Chief Justice of the United States from 1910 until his death in 1921, for a total of 27 years on the bench. He was a descendant of the Lee family of Virginia.

Born in Lafourche Parish, Louisiana, White practiced law in New Orleans after graduating from the University of Louisiana, now Tulane University. He also attended the College of the Immaculate Conception, present-day Jesuit High School in New Orleans, class of 1865. His father, Edward Douglass White Sr., was the 10th Governor of Louisiana and a Whig US Representative. White fought for the Confederacy during the Civil War and was captured in 1865. After the war, White won election to the Louisiana State Senate and served on the Louisiana Supreme Court. As a member of the Democratic Party, White represented Louisiana in the United States Senate from 1891 to 1894.

In 1894, President Grover Cleveland appointed White as an associate Justice of the U.S. Supreme Court. In 1910, President William Howard Taft elevated him to the position of chief justice. The appointment surprised many contemporaries, as Taft was a member of the Republican Party. White served as chief justice until his death in 1921, when he was succeeded by Taft.

White sided with the Supreme Court majority in Plessy v. Ferguson, upholding the legality of state segregation to provide "separate but equal" public facilities in the United States. White would go on to write notable opinions in landmark cases such as Talton v. Mayes, Lone Wolf v. Hitchcock, Guinn v. United States, and the Selective Draft Law Cases.

== Early life and education ==
White was born on November 3, 1845, on his family's sugar plantation near Thibodaux, Louisiana, about 30 miles (48 km) west of New Orleans. (Note: The home in which White was born is now known as the Edward Douglass White House; it is part of a Louisiana state park dedicated to White.) His father, Edward Douglass White Sr., was a lawyer and judge who had served as a U.S. Representative and as the governor of Louisiana. (Note: White Sr. was the son of James White, a doctor and lawyer who held various political positions in North Carolina, Tennessee, and Louisiana.) The elder White retired from Congress in 1843; his sugar plantation utilized dozens of slaves. His wife was Catherine Sidney Lee Ringgold, the daughter of influential Washington, D.C., businessman and politician Tench Ringgold; she was a descendant of the Lee family, and the future chief justice was thus distantly related to Confederate general Robert E. Lee. The couple had five children, of whom White Jr. was the youngest son. In April 1847, before his namesake son had reached his third birthday, White Sr. died. His wife remarried in 1850, wedding French-Canadian immigrant merchant Andre Brousseau. The family moved to New Orleans the subsequent year.

White attended a Jesuit school in New Orleans beginning at the age of six. Starting in 1856, he and his brother attended Mount St. Mary's College, near Emmitsburg, Maryland. White enrolled in 1858 at Georgetown University, which biographer Robert Baker Highsaw characterized as "probably the best Catholic institution of higher learning in the United States". It was distinctly Jesuit as well; university president John Early and a majority of the faculty were all members of the Society of Jesus. White's Jesuit training influenced his legal philosophy later in life, leading him to emphasize formal logical reasoning. At Georgetown, he studied the classics, the flute, and the violin; he also participated in the school's cadet corp. After the American Civil War broke out, White left Georgetown without a degree, returning home.

== Confederate soldier and Reconstruction ==
White's studies at Georgetown were interrupted by the Civil War. He enlisted in the Confederate States Army and served under General Richard Taylor, eventually attaining the rank of lieutenant.

An apocryphal account states that White was almost captured by Union troops near Bayou Lafourche in October 1862, but that he evaded capture by hiding beneath hay in a barn. It is possible that White enlisted in the Lafourche Parish militia, as its muster rolls are not complete. There is no documentation, however, that White served in any Confederate volunteer unit or militia unit engaged in campaigns in the Lafourche area.

Another account suggests that he was assigned as an aide to Confederate General William Beall and accompanied him to Port Hudson, Louisiana, which was besieged and captured by Union troops in 1863. White's presence at Port Hudson, when he was 18 years old, is supported by a secondhand account of a postwar dinner conversation he had with Senator Knute Nelson of Minnesota, a Union veteran of Port Hudson, and another recounted by Admiral George Dewey (then a Federal naval officer at Port Hudson), in both of which White referred to being part of the besieged forces. But White's name does not appear on any list of prisoners captured at Port Hudson. According to another account of questionable reliability, White was supposedly sent to a Mississippi prisoner of war camp. As practically all Confederate soldiers of enlisted rank of the Port Hudson garrison were paroled, and officers sent to prison in New Orleans and later to Johnson's Island, Ohio, this account is likely not true. When White was paroled, he supposedly returned to the family plantation to find it abandoned, the canefields barren, and the place nearly empty of most of its former slaves.

The only documented evidence of White's Confederate service consists of an account of his capture on March 12, 1865, in an action in Morganza in Pointe Coupee Parish, which is contained in the Official Records of the American Civil War, and his service records in the National Archives, noting his subsequent imprisonment in New Orleans and parole in April 1865. These records confirm his service as a lieutenant in Captain W. B. Barrow's company of a Louisiana cavalry regiment, for all practical purposes a loosely organized band of irregulars or "scouts" (guerrillas). One organizing officer of this regiment, which was sometimes called "Barrow's Regiment" or the "9th Louisiana Cavalry Regiment," was Major Robert Pruyn. Pruyn (a postwar mayor of Baton Rouge, Louisiana) served as courier relaying messages from Port Hudson's commander, General Franklin Gardner, to General Joseph E. Johnston, crossing the Union siege lines by swimming the Mississippi. Pruyn escaped from Port Hudson prior to its surrender in the same manner. According to another account, after White was paroled in April 1865 and following the surrender of the western Confederate forces, he ended his military career by walking (his clothing in rags) to a comrade's family home in Livonia in Pointe Coupee Parish.

White's Civil War service was taken as a matter of common knowledge at the time of his initial nomination to the United States Supreme Court, and the Confederate Veteran periodical, published for the United Confederate Veterans, congratulated him upon his confirmation. White was one of three ex-Confederate soldiers to serve on the Supreme Court. The others were associate justices Lucius Quintus Cincinnatus Lamar of Mississippi and Horace Harmon Lurton of Tennessee. The Court's other ex-Confederate, Associate Justice Howell Edmunds Jackson, had held a civil position under the Confederate government.

White's membership in the Ku Klux Klan is a matter of contention. Some authors, such as Michael Newton, claim White was a "Reconstruction Era Klansman." Other reports question whether there is enough evidence to support that claim, though noting that membership in secret societies such as the KKK can be difficult to document.

According to biographer Paul Finkelman:

Although the moviemaker D. W. Griffith claimed White endorsed his racist movie, The Birth of a Nation (1915), and asserted that White had been in the Ku Klux Klan, there is no evidence to support either of Griffith's contentions.

However, Griffith claimed that when he met White, and told White of the subject matter of The Birth of a Nation, White said "I was a member of the Klan, sir." Griffith then arranged a screening of his film for the nine members of the Supreme Court and members of Congress.

In 1877, White served on the Reception Committee of the Knights of Momus in New Orleans. The Knights' Mardi Gras parade was an attack on Reconstruction so extreme that it was widely condemned, and even denounced by the Krewe of Rex.

== Political career ==
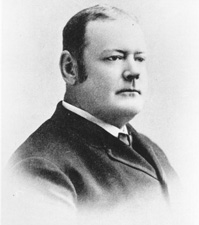
Edward White as a U.S. Senator

While living on his family's abandoned plantation, White began his legal studies. He enrolled at the University of Louisiana in New Orleans to complete his study of the law, at what is now known as Tulane University Law School. He subsequently was admitted to the bar and commenced practice in New Orleans in 1868. He was also mentored as a young attorney by Edouard Bermudez, a New Orleans lawyer who later served as chief justice of the Louisiana Supreme Court.

White served in the Louisiana State Senate in 1874, a year marked by interracial violence in political campaigns and elections. He also served on the Louisiana Supreme Court from 1878 to 1880. In 1891, the State Legislature elected him to the United States Senate to succeed James B. Eustis. During his time in state politics, White was politically affiliated with two-time governor Francis T. Nicholls (1876–1880; 1888–1892), a former Confederate general. He was Nicholls' campaign manager in the 1888 Louisiana gubernatorial election, which was riddled with fraud and the intimidation of African American voters to ensure Nicholls' election.

== United States Supreme Court ==
=== Associate justice ===
White was nominated by President Grover Cleveland to be an associate justice of the Supreme Court of the United States on February 19, 1894, after the Senate had rejected his first two nominees: William B. Hornblower and Wheeler Hazard Peckham. In contrast to those nominations, the Senate confirmed White the same day on a voice vote. He took the judicial oath of office a few weeks later, March 12, 1894.

In 1896, White was a part of the 7–1 majority in Plessy v. Ferguson, which upheld the constitutionality of racial segregation laws for public facilities as long as the segregated facilities were equal in quality. He also participated in the Insular Cases of the early 20th century regarding the relationship of the United States to its territories acquired in the Spanish–American War, where he concurred with the 5–4 decision in Downes v. Bidwell (1901) that the newly-annexed territories were not properly part of the United States for purposes of the Constitution in several ways. However, wrote White, the constitutional guarantees of a citizen's rights of liberty and property were applicable to all and "cannot be under any circumstances transcended."

=== Chief justice ===
White as he appeared in Harper's Magazine in 1910

On December 12, 1910, President William Howard Taft nominated White to become Chief Justice of the United States, following the death of Melville Fuller. The appointment was unusual, as White was the first incumbent associate justice to be appointed as chief justice. (John Rutledge, a former associate justice, had been given a recess appointment as chief justice in 1795). The wisdom of elevating an associate justice to chief justice was questioned, as were Taft's motives for selecting White. Nonetheless, the Senate confirmed White the same day, and again on a voice vote. He became the nation's ninth chief justice on December 19, 1910.

White was generally seen as one of the more conservative members of the court. He originated the term "Rule of Reason." He also joined the Hammer v. Dagenhart decision, ruling that the federal government could not ban child labor. However, White also wrote the 1916 decision upholding the constitutionality of the Adamson Act, which mandated a maximum eight-hour work day for railroad employees. White's background as a Democrat, Confederate veteran and Southern lawyer might have predicted legal positions that would have sought to curtail federal power. Yet, surprisingly, White articulated nationalist positions in his decisions, much like President Taft. He supported expanded regulation and taxation by Congress. He was usually conservative in racial issues, as were most justices. However, he wrote the majority decisions in favor of civil rights in important cases. Late in life, he expressed sorrow at the entire Civil War experience and his role in it.

As chief justice at a time when the Court's work was carried out with more than 8,000 cases brought each year before the court, and only a few clerks to work for all the members of the Court, White held weekly meetings with fellow jurists, assigned all the cases and wrote the majority opinions in 711 cases, as well as 155 dissenting opinions. He wrote for a unanimous Court in Guinn v. United States (1915), which invalidated the Oklahoma and Maryland grandfather clauses (and, by extension, those in other Southern states) as "repugnant to the Fifteenth Amendment and therefore null and void." Nevertheless, Southern states quickly devised other methods to continue their disfranchisement of blacks (and in some cases, many poor whites) that withstood Court scrutiny.

In 1918, the Selective Draft Law Cases upheld the Selective Service Act of 1917, and more generally, upheld conscription in the United States, which President Taft said was "one of his great opinions."

During his tenure as chief justice, White swore in presidents Woodrow Wilson (twice) and Warren G. Harding. At the time of his death on May 19, 1921, he had served on the Court for a total of 27 years, 10 of them as chief justice. He was succeeded by former president Taft, who had elevated White to the chief justice seat and had long desired the seat himself.

== Personal life and death ==
White married Leita Montgomery Kent, the widow of Linden Kent, on November 6, 1894, in New York City. His wife was the daughter of Romonzo and Virginia High Montgomery; White proposed to her before her first marriage but was turned down, and proposed again after her first husband died in 1892.

White's paternal ancestors were of Irish Catholic descent, and he was reared in that religion, a Roman Catholic his entire life.

White died from a sudden heart attack on May 19, 1921, at the age of 75. He is buried at the Oak Hill Cemetery in Washington, D.C.

== Legacy and honors ==
- In 1914, he was awarded the Laetare Medal by the University of Notre Dame, the oldest and most prestigious award for American Catholics.
- A statue of White is one of the two honoring Louisiana natives in the National Statuary Hall in the U.S. Capitol.
- A statue of White was located in front of the Louisiana Supreme Court building in New Orleans until it was removed in December 2020. This statue was a local landmark on the New Orleans scene, created by Bryant Baker, who was selected for the commission by White's widow, and dedicated April 8, 1926.
- In his honor, the Louisiana State University Law Center founded the annual Edward Douglass White Lectures. They have featured such distinguished speakers as U.S. chief justices Warren E. Burger and William H. Rehnquist.
- The play, Father Chief Justice: Edward Douglass White and the Constitution by Paul Baier, a professor at LSU Law Center, was based on White's life.
- In 1995, White was posthumously inducted into the Louisiana Political Museum and Hall of Fame in Winnfield.
- Edward Douglass White Council #2473 of the Knights of Columbus in Arlington, Virginia, was named in his honor, but dropped the name in August 2020.
- The John F. Kennedy Council #2586 of the Knights of Columbus serving Bogota and Teaneck, New Jersey, was once named in White's honor but was changed due to contemporary societal views on slavery.
- Edward Douglas White Catholic High School in Thibodaux, Louisiana, was named for him.
- During World War II the Liberty ship SS Edward D. White was built in Brunswick, Georgia, and named in his honor.

== See also ==
- List of justices of the Supreme Court of the United States
- List of United States Supreme Court justices by time in office
- United States Supreme Court cases during the White Court
- List of United States federal judges by longevity of service

== Sources ==
- United States Congress. "Edward Douglass White (id: W000366)". Biographical Directory of the United States Congress. Retrieved on 2009-04-11
- "Chief Justice White Is Dead at Age 75 After an Operation." The New York Times. May 19, 1921
- Floyd, William Barrow, The Barrow Family of Old Louisiana, (Transylvania Printing Co., Lexington, Ky., 1963)
- Highsaw, Robert B. (1981) Edward Douglass White: Defender of the Conservative Faith, Baton Rouge: Louisiana State University Press, ISBN 0807124281.
- Kent, Andrew. "The Rebel Soldier Who Became Chief Justice of the United States: The Civil War and its Legacy for Edward Douglass White of Louisiana." American Journal of Legal History (2016) 56#2 pp 209–264.
- Klinkhammer, Marie. (1943) Edward Douglass White, Chief Justice of the United States. Washington, D.C.: Catholic University of America Press.
- Pratt, Walter F. (1999) The Supreme Court Under Edward Douglass White, 1910–1921. Columbia: University of South Carolina Press. ISBN 1-57003-309-9.
- Reeves, William D., Paths to Distinction: Dr. James White, Governor E.D. White and Chief Justice Edward Douglass White of Louisiana. Thibodaux, La., 1999: Friends of the Edward Douglass White Historic Site. ISBN 1-887366-33-4.
- Davis, Peggy Cooper, "Introducing Robert Smalls" (2001). Fordham Law Review, Vol. 69, No. 5, 2001.

U.S. Senate
Preceded by James Eustis	U.S. senator (Class 3) from Louisiana; 1891–1894; Served alongside: Randall Gibson, Donelson Caffery	Succeeded by Newton Blanchard
Preceded by John P. Jones	Chair of the Senate Contingent Expenses Audit Committee; 1893–1894	Succeeded by Johnson N. Camden
Legal offices
Preceded by Samuel Blatchford	Associate Justice of the Supreme Court of the United States; 1894–1910	Succeeded by Willis Van Devanter
Preceded by Melville Fuller	Chief Justice of the United States; 1910–1921	Succeeded by William Taft
