= Virginie de Ternant =

American plantation owner

Marie Virginie de Ternant, née Trahan (August 16, 1818 – November 7, 1887), was the owner and manager of the Parlange Plantation, near New Roads, Pointe Coupee Parish, Louisiana. It was through her strong personality, diplomacy and charm that she saved the house from destruction throughout its occupation by both the Union and Confederate armies during the American Civil War.

== Background ==
She was the second wife of Claude Vincent de Ternant, whose grandfather had built the plantation house in 1750 on the property obtained by a French land grant in 1720. She had three surviving children from this marriage. Through Marie Virginie, her eldest daughter, she was the grandmother of the celebrated Parisian socialite, Virginie Amélie Avegno Gautreau, who was the subject of John Singer Sargent's painting "Portrait of Madame X".

Her second husband was Colonel Charles Parlange from whom her home derived its name. By him she had one son, Charles Parlange.

As the Union Army led by General Nathaniel Banks was approaching Parlange, Virginie, by that time a widow and the manager of the plantation, ordered her slaves to bury three chests of treasure estimated at between one third and a half million dollars in gold and silver coins. One of these chests has never been found.

Virginie, who was responsible for Parlange's reputation for elegance by her addition of rich, beautiful furnishings and portraits, is described as "the chief personality for Parlange Plantation's greatness".

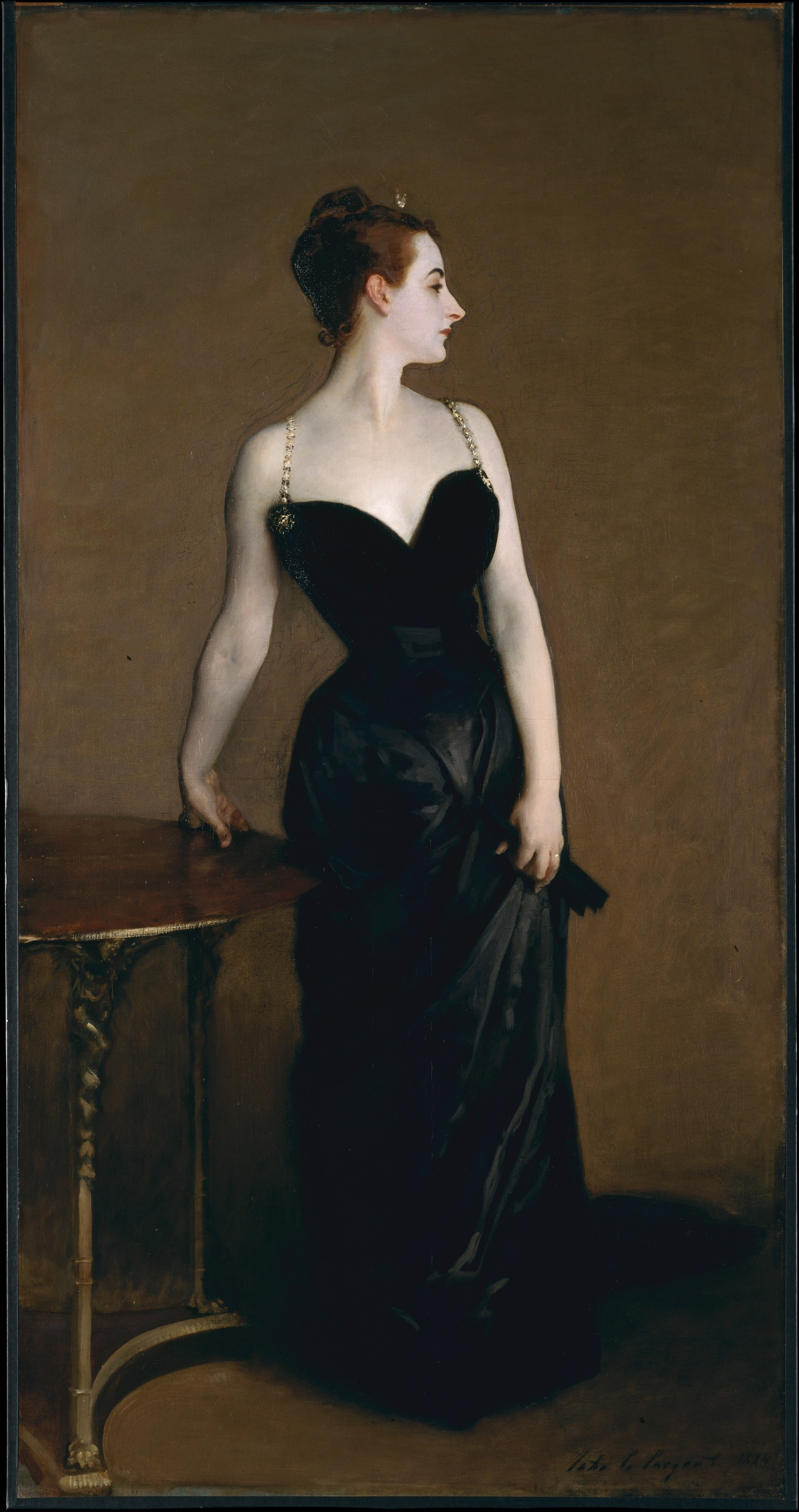
Virginie Amélie Avegno Gautreau, better known as "Madame X", was the granddaughter of Virginie

== Marriages and children ==
Marie Virginie Trahan was born on August 16, 1818, in St Martinville, Louisiana, the daughter of Leufroy Joseph Trahan (1797-?) and Julie Ardoin (April 12, 1795 – April 8, 1827) who were both white French Créoles. She had two younger sisters, Marie Eriphile and Ameline. She lost her mother when she was eight years old. At the age of 17, she married her second cousin and guardian, Claude Vincent de Ternant. She was his second wife, with his first marriage to Dorothee Legros having been childless. The marriage between Claude and Virginie produced three surviving children:

- Marius Claude de Ternant (1836–1861)
- Marie Virginie de Ternant (1837 - 1910), married Anatole Placide Avegno (July 3, 1835 - April 1862), by whom she had children, including Virginie Amélie Avegno Gautreau, better known as "Madame X".
- Julie Eriphile de Ternant (born 1839, died as a young woman)

Out of her three children who lived past childhood, only her eldest daughter, Marie Virginie, survived to marry and have children of her own. Virginie's son Marius lived a dissolute life and died at the age of 25, while her youngest daughter Julie was accidentally killed by smashing her head into an oak tree. It was alleged that she was running away from home to escape the planned marriage that her parents had arranged for her.

Following her husband's death in 1842, she married a Frenchman in 1844, Charles Parlange (1812-1867), who served as a colonel in the French Army. It was he who gave the plantation its name. Together they had one son, Charles (July 23, 1851 – February 4, 1907), who would enjoy a distinguished political career as a state senator, United States Attorney, Lieutenant Governor of Louisiana, Associate Justice of the Louisiana Supreme Court, and United States federal judge. By his wife, Louise Denis, he was the father of three children.

Virginie and her second husband spent much of their married life in New Orleans and Paris.

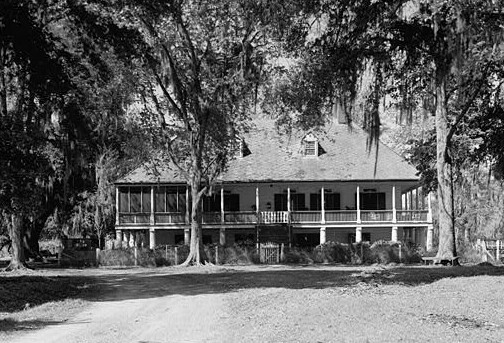
Virginie's home, Parlange Plantation in Pointe Coupee Parish, Louisiana

== Parlange Plantation ==
Virginie's first husband, Claude de Ternant, upon inheriting the 10,000-acre (40 km^{2}) plantation from his father, switched from growing indigo to sugarcane and cotton. Virginie lavished great care on the decoration of the home, adding opulent furnishings, and many family portraits; through her efforts, Parlange Plantation acquired renown throughout Louisiana for beauty and elegance. A full-length portrait of Virginie was painted in France by Claude-Marie Dubufe.

When the American Civil War broke out in April 1861, Virginie, living in Paris, returned to Louisiana. In 1864, after she had received word that the Union Army was approaching, she hid her furniture, portraits, priceless silver, china, jewelry and clothing. She and her son, Charles placed the Parlange treasure into three large wooden chests; this was estimated to have been between one third and a half million dollars in gold and silver coins. She ordered two of her most trusted black slaves to bury the chests in the garden. When the Union troops led by General Nathaniel Banks arrived at Parlange, she greeted them warmly, inviting the officers to a lavish banquet and allowing the general and his aide to sleep inside the house, while the soldiers were encamped in her formal gardens. The Union Army used her home for their headquarters; and it was through Virginie's tact and charm, which impressed General Banks and his men, that her home was spared destruction. When Confederate General Richard Taylor and his troops later came, she offered them the same warm hospitality.

At the end of the war, she retrieved her hidden valuables; only one of the chests containing the coins could not be found. It remains lost to this day.

The plantation's fortunes were, however, nearly depleted after the war, and she was compelled to make her own clothing. In 1867, her widowed daughter, Marie Virginie Avegno took her eight-year-old child, Virginie Amélie Avegno to Paris where they ensconced themselves in the highest echelons of Parisian society. The latter eventually became a socialite, married a French banker and shipping magnate; and earned notoriety as the subject of John Singer Sargent's painting, "Portrait of Madame X".

After Virginie's death on November 7, 1887, the plantation house remained empty for 20 years until her grandson Walter Parlange returned to take up the life of a plantation farmer. As of 2014, her direct descendants continue to live at Parlange Plantation.

== In fiction ==
The history of Virginie de Ternant and the Parlange Plantation has been the inspiration for the Bagatelle Plantation and the heroine Virginie Tregan in the novel Louisiane by Maurice Denuzière.
