= Gustave-Claude-Etienne Courtois =

French painter (1852–1923)

Gustave Courtois
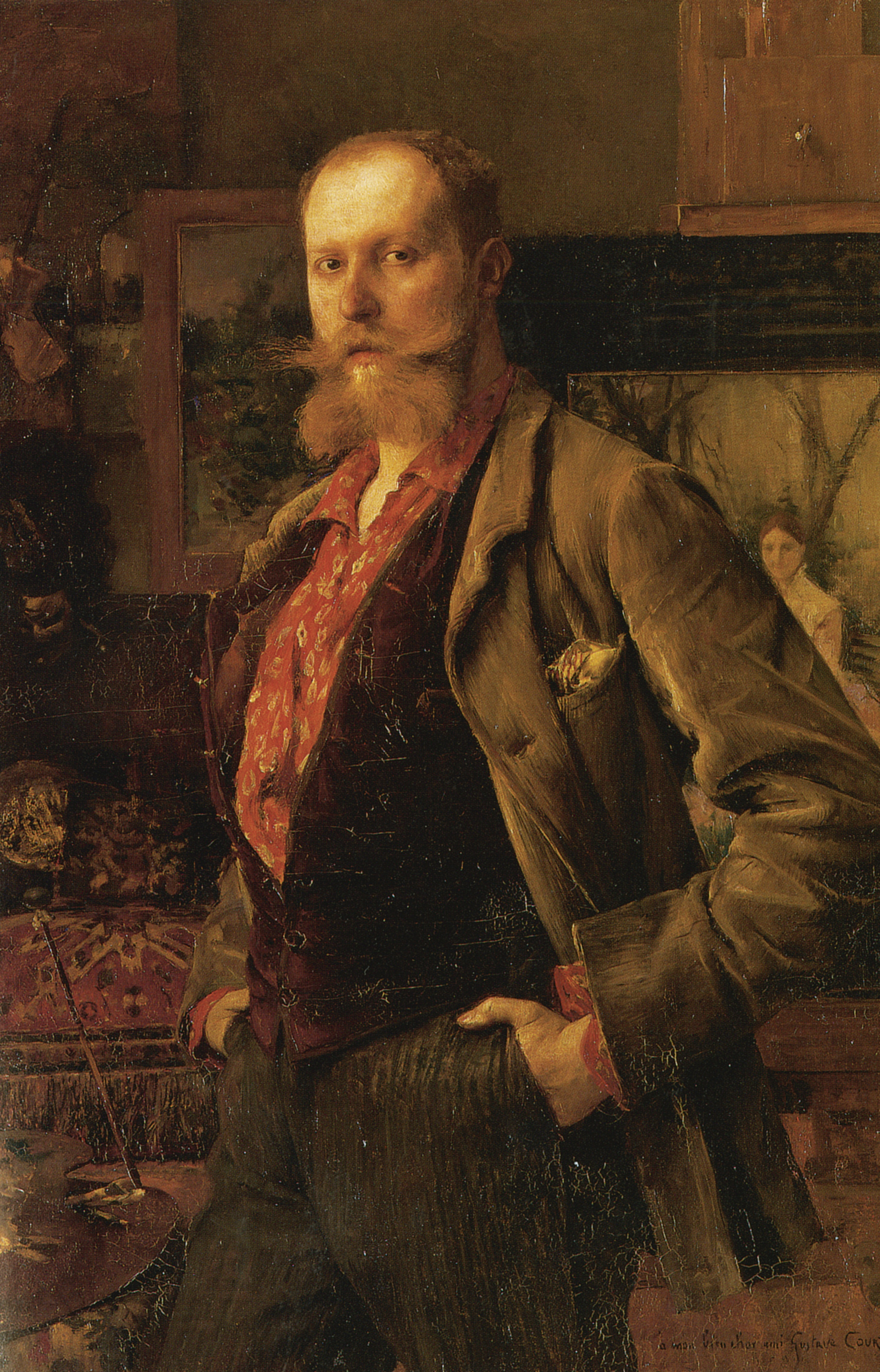
- An 1884 portrait of Courtois by Pascal Dagnan-Bouveret
- Born: Gustave-Claude-Étienne Courtois; May 18, 1852; Pusey, France
- Died: November 23, 1923 (aged 71); Neuilly-sur-Seine, France

Gustave-Claude-Étienne Courtois, also known as Gustave Courtois (French: [ɡystav kuʁtwa]; 18 May 1852 in Pusey, Haute-Saône – 23 November 1923 in Neuilly-sur-Seine) was a French painter, a representative of the academic style of art.

== Early life and education ==
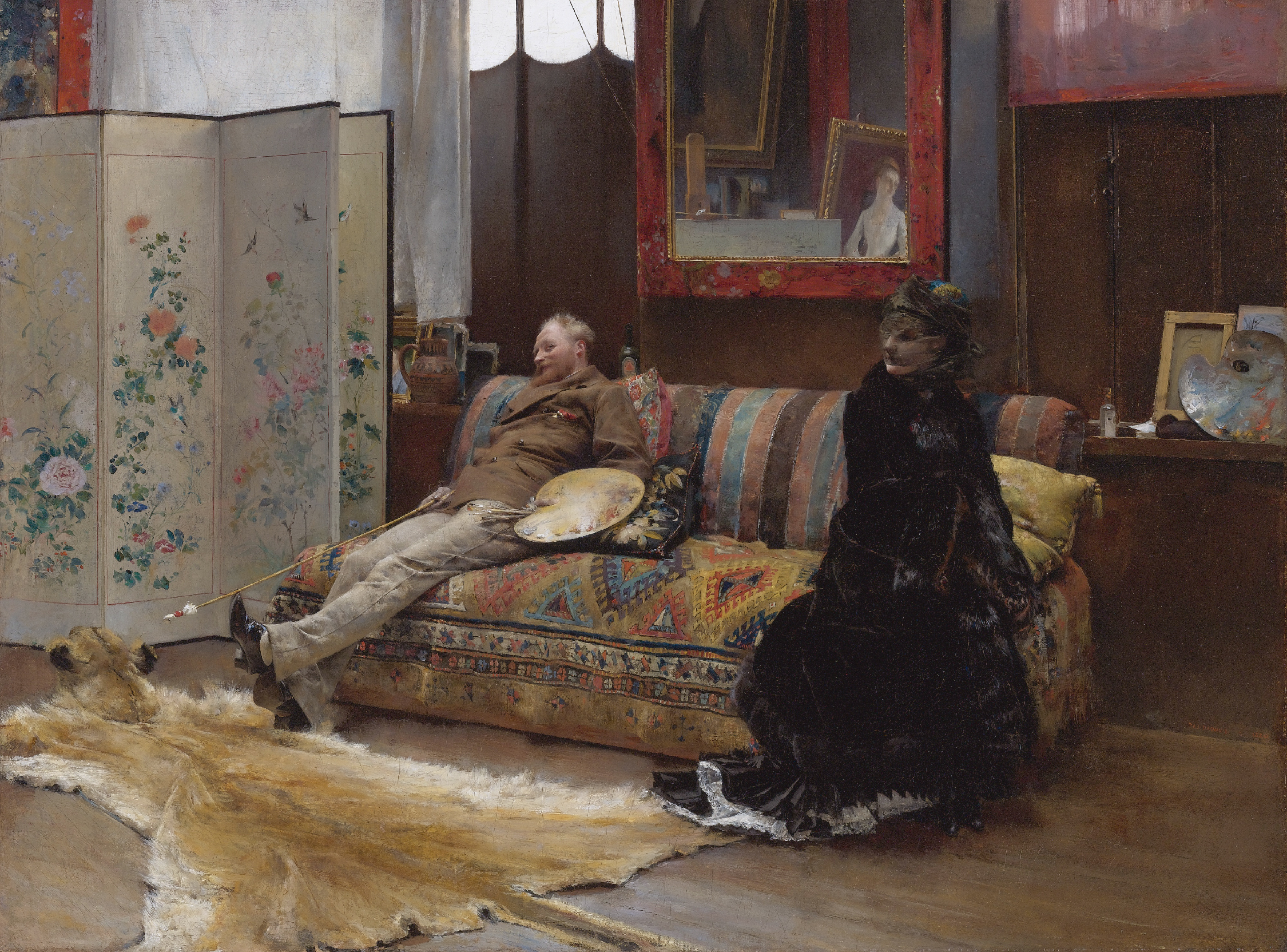
Courtois in his studio, Pascal Dagnan-Bouveret, in 1880

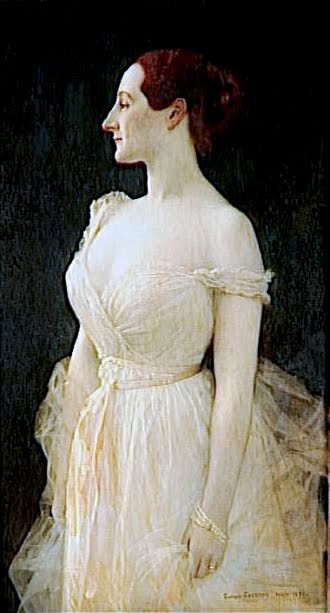
Courtois portrait, Madame Gautreau, completed in 1891

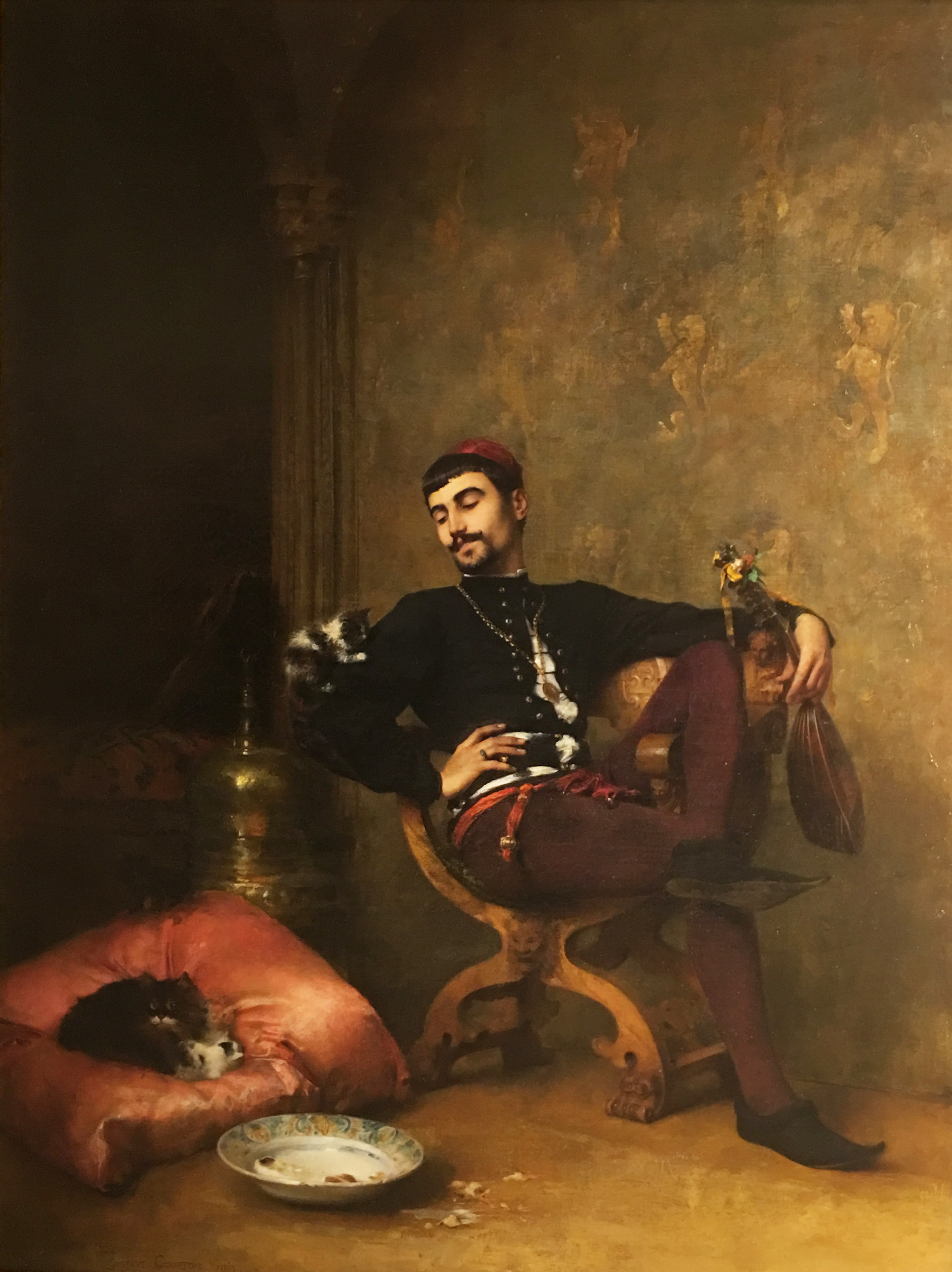
Young Florentin Playing with Cats, a portrait by Courtois

Courtois was born 18 May 1852 in Pusey, Haute-Saône, France, to an unwed mother who was devoted to him. Early in life, Courtois revealed an interest in art and entered the École municipale de dessin in Vesoul (Franche-Comté). His drawings were shown to Jean-Léon Gérôme, and in 1869, Gérôme encouraged Courtois to enter the École nationale supérieure des Beaux-Arts in Paris. Courtois was in close friendship with fellow student Pascal Dagnan-Bouveret, with whom he maintained a fashionable studio in Neuilly-sur-Seine from the 1880s.

== Career ==
Courtois taught painting at Académie de la Grande Chaumière, Académie Colarossi in Paris, where Harriet Campbell Foss, Eva Bonnier, Emma Cheves Wilkins, and Dora Hitz were students.

Courtois exhibited at the Salon de Paris, receiving a third-place medal in 1878 and a second-place medal in 1880. He was awarded a gold medal at the Exposition Universelle in 1889 and exhibited at the Salon de la Société Nationale des Beaux-Arts after exhibiting at Salon de Paris until his death.

His paintings can be seen in the art galleries of Besançon, Marseille, Bordeaux, and Luxembourg. He was a Chevalier of the Legion of Honor, decorated in 1889. Among his students were Willard Dryden Paddock, Mary Rose Hill Burton, and Sara Page.

Gustave Courtois was a close friend of the Finnish artist Albert Edelfelt. They lived in the same studio building in Paris, socialized daily, shared many artistic ideals and supported each other in their work.

== Sources ==
- Robert Fernier. Gustave Courtois: 1852-1923, 1943.
- Gabriel P. Weisberg. Against the Modern: Dagnan-Bouveret and the Transformation of the Academic Tradition, 2002.
