= 1904 Louisiana gubernatorial election =

- April 19, 1904
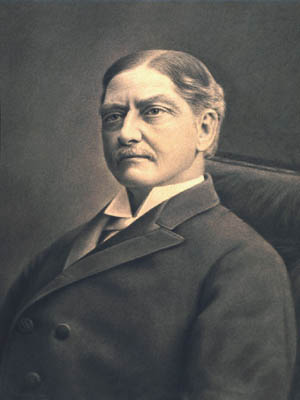

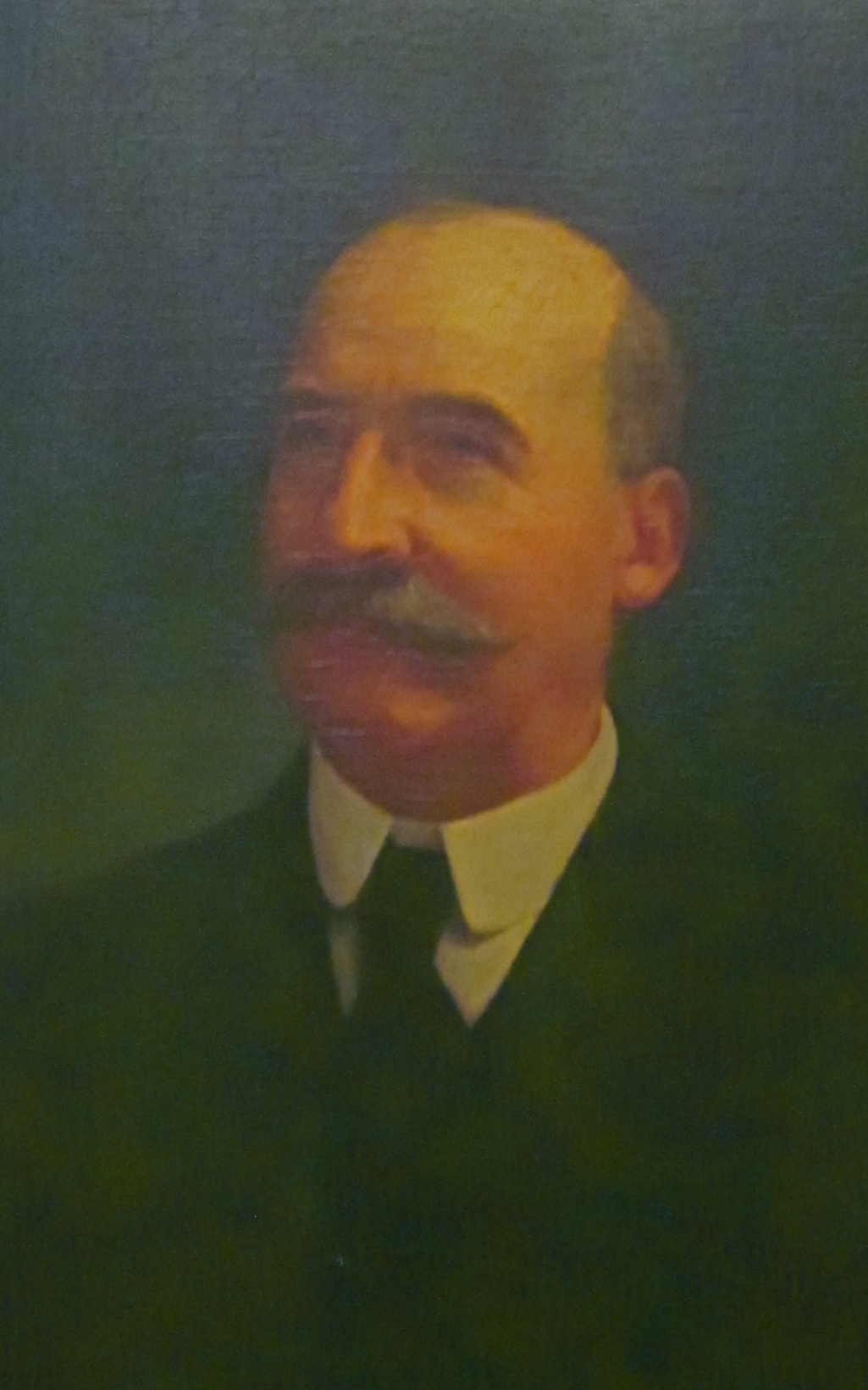
Nominee	Newton C. Blanchard	William J. Behan
Party	Democratic	Republican
Popular vote	47,745	5,877
Percentage	89.04%	10.96%
- Parish Results; Blanchard: 50–60% 60–70% 70–80% 80–90% >90%
Governor before election
William Wright Heard
Democratic
Elected Governor
Newton C. Blanchard
Democratic

The 1904 Louisiana gubernatorial election was held on April 19, 1904. Like most Southern states between Reconstruction and the civil rights era, Louisiana's Republican Party had virtually no electoral support. As Louisiana had not yet adopted party primaries, this meant that the Democratic Party convention nomination vote was the real contest over who would be governor. The election resulted in the election of Democrat Newton C. Blanchard as governor of Louisiana.

== Results ==
General Election, April 19

Party	Candidate	Votes received	Percent
Democratic	Newton C. Blanchard	47,745	89.04%
Republican	William J. Behan	5,877	10.96%

Preceded by 1900 gubernatorial election	Louisiana gubernatorial elections	Succeeded by 1908 gubernatorial election
