= Parlange Plantation House =

Historic house in Louisiana, United States

- U.S. National Register of Historic Places
- U.S. National Historic Landmark
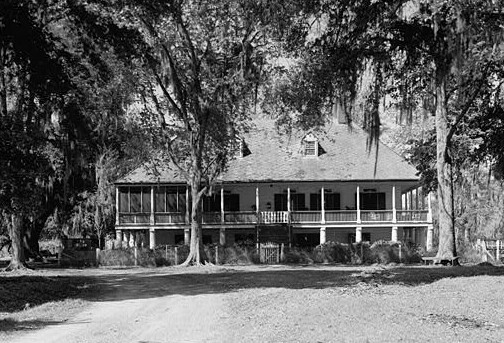
- Parlange Plantation House, 1936 HABS photo

- Location within Louisiana Location within the United States
- Nearest city: Mix, Louisiana
- Coordinates: 30.63036°N 91.48763°W
- Built: c. 1750 (disputed)
- Architectural style: French Colonial
- NRHP reference No.: 70000258

Significant dates
- Added to NRHP: April 15, 1970
- Designated NHL: May 30, 1974

The Parlange Plantation House (French: Plantation Parlange) is a historic plantation house at Louisiana Highway 1 and Louisiana Highway 78 in Pointe Coupee Parish, Louisiana. The plantation is a classic example of a large French Colonial plantation house in the United States. Its construction date is disputed. Oral history indicates a date of c. 1750 for both establishment of the plantation and construction of the house. Scholarly works accept the establishment date only, having found strong evidence for a construction date from 1830-1840.

The home exemplifies the style of the semi-tropical Louisiana river country house, the Parlange Plantation home is a two-story raised cottage. The main floor is set on a brick basement with brick pillars to support the veranda of the second story. The raised basement is of brick, manufactured by enslaved people on the plantation. The walls, both inside and out, were plastered with a native mixture of mud, sand, Spanish moss and animal hair (bousillage), then painted. The ground story and second floors contain seven service rooms, arranged in a double line. The walls and ceiling throughout the house were constructed of close-fitting bald cypress planks.

There is an octagonal pigeonnier near the house. The home was once surrounded by a formal garden, but the garden was destroyed during the Civil War and never rebuilt.

== History of the plantation and the Ternant-Parlange family ==
Vincent de Ternant, known as the Marquis of Dansville-sur-Meuse, received the plantation grounds in a French land grant and developed the 10,000 acres (40 km^{2}) into an active plantation facing False River. When de Ternant's son Claude inherited the plantation, he changed the cash crop from indigo to sugarcane and cotton.

When Claude de Ternant died, his second wife Virginie remarried. (By her first husband, Virginie was the maternal grandmother of Parisian socialite Virginie Amélie Avegno Gautreau, who was the subject of John Singer Sargent's portrait "Madame X".) Virginie's second husband, another Frenchman, was Colonel Charles Parlange, from whom the plantation took its name.

During the American Civil War, Parlange alternatively served as Union headquarters for General Nathaniel Banks and Confederate headquarters for General Richard Taylor.

Colonel and Mrs. Parlange had one son, also named Charles, who survived the Civil War to begin a distinguished career as a State Senator, United States District Attorney, Lieutenant Governor, federal judge, and finally justice of the Louisiana Supreme Court.

After Virginie Parlange died in 1887, her son and his wife moved to New Orleans. Judge and Mrs. Charles Parlange leased the plantation to tenants for the next twenty years, until their son Walter Parlange returned to Pointe Coupée Parish to take up the life of a plantation farmer.

Today Parlange retains 1500 acres (6 km^{2}), which are still used as a cattle and sugarcane plantation. It is owned and operated by descendants of the original owners. The plantation house remains largely intact and is occasionally available for private tours by appointment only. It is located near the intersection of Louisiana Highway 1 and Louisiana Highway 78.

== Popular culture ==
The Parlange Plantation and the history of Virginie de Ternant was the inspiration for the Bagatelle Plantation and the heroine Virginie Tregan in the novel Louisiane by Maurice Denuzière.

== See also ==
- List of plantations in Louisiana
- List of National Historic Landmarks in Louisiana
- National Register of Historic Places listings in Pointe Coupee Parish, Louisiana
- List of the oldest buildings in Louisiana
