= Charles Parlange =

American judge

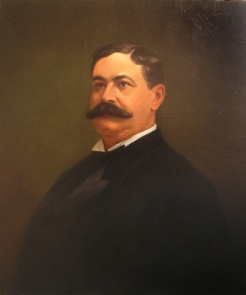

21st Lieutenant Governor of Louisiana
- In office 1892–1893
- Governor: Murphy J. Foster
- Preceded by: James Jeffries
- Succeeded by: Hiram R. Lott

Judge of the United States District Court for the Eastern District of Louisiana
- In office January 15, 1894 – February 4, 1907
- Appointed by: Grover Cleveland
- Preceded by: Edward Coke Billings
- Succeeded by: Eugene Davis Saunders

Member of the Louisiana Senate
- In office 1880-1885

Personal details
- Born: Charles Parlange; July 23, 1851 New Orleans, Louisiana
- Died: February 4, 1907 (aged 55) New Orleans, Louisiana
- Resting place: Metairie Cemetery; New Orleans, Louisiana
- Parent: Virginie de Ternant (mother)
- Education: Centenary College read law

Charles Parlange (July 23, 1851 – February 4, 1907) was a Louisiana state senator, United States attorney, Louisiana lieutenant governor serving under Governor Murphy J. Foster, associate justice of the Louisiana Supreme Court, and United States district judge of the United States District Court for the Eastern District of Louisiana.

== Education and career ==
Born on July 23, 1851, in New Orleans, Louisiana, Parlange attended Centenary College of Louisiana and read law in 1873. He entered private practice in Pointe Coupee Parish, Louisiana from 1873 to 1880. He was named United States Commissioner from Louisiana to the Paris Exposition of 1878 and was a member of the Louisiana Constitutional Convention of 1879. He was a member of the Louisiana State Senate from 1880 to 1885. He was the United States Attorney for the Eastern District of Louisiana from 1885 to 1889. He resumed private practice in New Orleans from 1889 to 1892. He was the Lieutenant Governor of Louisiana from 1892 to 1893. He was an associate justice of the Supreme Court of Louisiana from 1893 to 1894.

== Federal judicial service ==
Parlange was nominated by President Grover Cleveland on December 11, 1893, to a seat on the United States District Court for the Eastern District of Louisiana vacated by Judge Edward Coke Billings. He was confirmed by the United States Senate on January 15, 1894, and received his commission the same day. His service terminated on February 4, 1907, due to his death in New Orleans. He was interred in Metairie Cemetery in New Orleans.

== Family ==
Parlange was the son of Charles and Virginie (Trahan) Parlange of Pointe Coupee Parish. During his childhood he resided at Parlange Plantation near New Roads, Louisiana. He was the uncle of Virginie Amélie Avegno Gautreau, better known as Madame X of John Singer Sargent's celebrated portrait.

== Sources ==
Political offices
Preceded by James Jeffries	Lieutenant Governor of Louisiana; 1892–1893	Succeeded by Hiram R. Lott
Legal offices
Preceded by Charles E. Fenner	Associate Justice of the Louisiana Supreme Court; 1893–1894	Succeeded by Henry C. Miller
Preceded by Edward Coke Billings	Judge of the United States District Court for the Eastern District of Louisiana; 1894–1907	Succeeded by Eugene Davis Saunders
