= Frederick Ogden =

Frederick or Fred Ogden may refer to:

- Frederick B. Ogden (1827–1893), American politician
- Frederick Nash Ogden (1837–1886), Confederate soldier and American white supremacist
- Frederick Ogden (politician) (1871–1933), British politician
- Fred Ogden (1925–2008), English footballer, see List of Oldham Athletic A.F.C. players
