= Donelson Caffery =

American politician

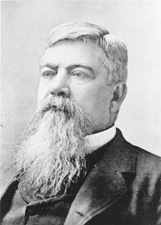

United States Senator from Louisiana
- In office December 31, 1892 – March 3, 1901
- Preceded by: Randall L. Gibson
- Succeeded by: Murphy J. Foster

Personal details
- Born: September 10, 1835 Franklin, Louisiana, U.S.
- Died: December 30, 1906 (aged 71) New Orleans, Louisiana, U.S.
- Party: Democratic
- Relations: Patrick T. Caffery (grandson)

Donelson Caffery (September 10, 1835 – December 30, 1906) was an American politician from the state of Louisiana, a soldier in the American Civil War, and a sugar plantation owner.

== Biography ==
Caffery was born in Franklin, Louisiana, the seat of St. Mary Parish. His great-grandfather, Colonel John Donelson, co-founder of the city of Nashville, was the father-in-law of President of the United States Andrew Jackson. During the American Civil War, Caffery served in the Confederate army as a lieutenant in the 13th Louisiana Infantry Regiment. After the war, he became a lawyer and owned a sugar plantation. He was elected to the Louisiana State Senate, he was a Democrat, and in 1892, he was appointed to the United States Senate from Louisiana to fill the unexpired term of Randall L. Gibson who died in office. Caffery began a full six-year term in 1894, on election by the Louisiana State Legislature, and he served in the Senate until 1901.

He was a strong anti-imperialist and anti-expansionist, a position driven by his concern that new American possessions in tropical climates(like Puerto Rico, Hawaii, and the Philippines) would harm his fellow Louisiana sugar planters by flooding the market with cheaper (and now tariff-free) sugar.

He was the first nominee for President of the United States of the "Democratic National Party" at its Indianapolis Convention in 1900 but declined the nomination of this group. He declined to seek a second full term in 1900. The a group of anti-imperialists, meeting in New York on 5 September 1900, also nominated Caffery for President and Boston attorney and historian Archibald M. Howe for Vice President. Caffery, a staunch Democrat, likewise refused this nomination, and Howe quickly withdrew as well.

Caffery served as chairman of the Senate Committee on enrolled bills from 1893 to 1894 and as chairman of the Senate Committee on corporations organized in the District of Columbia from 1899 to 1901.

After he left the Senate, Caffery resumed practicing law. He died in 1906 on December 30 in New Orleans Louisiana, and is interred at Franklin Cemetery in his native Franklin.

Caffery's son, Donelson Caffery, Jr., was the gubernatorial nominee of the "Lily-White" faction of the Republican Party in the 1900 Louisiana gubernatorial election. He lost badly to W. W. Heard.

Caffery's grandson, Patrick T. Caffery, served one term in the Louisiana House of Representatives and two terms in the United States House of Representatives from 1969–73.

U.S. Senate
Preceded by Randall L. Gibson	U.S. senator (Class 2) from Louisiana; 1892–1901; Served alongside: Edward D. White, Newton C. Blanchard, Samuel D. McEnery	Succeeded by Murphy J. Foster
