= 1892 Louisiana gubernatorial election =

- April 19, 1892
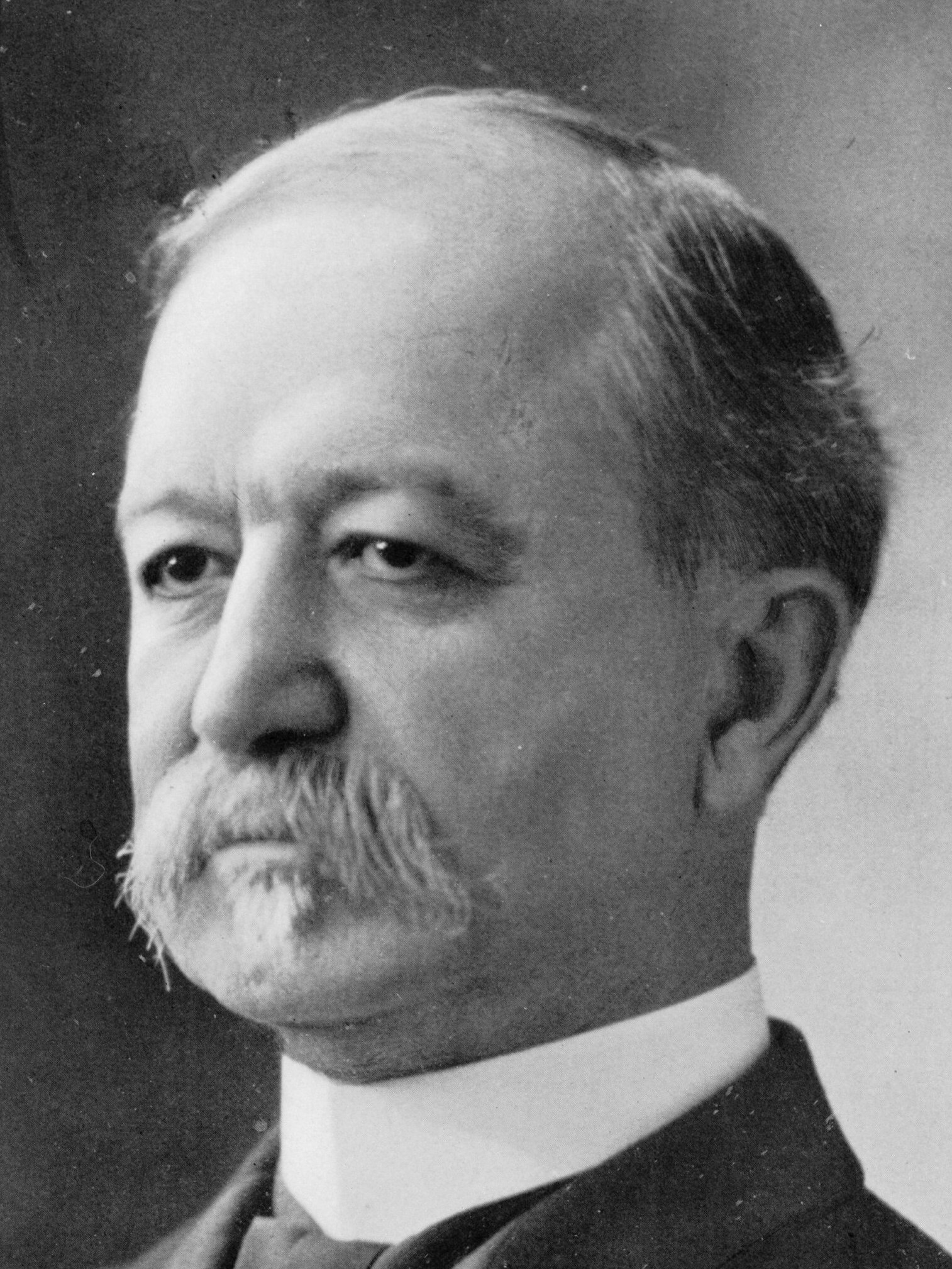

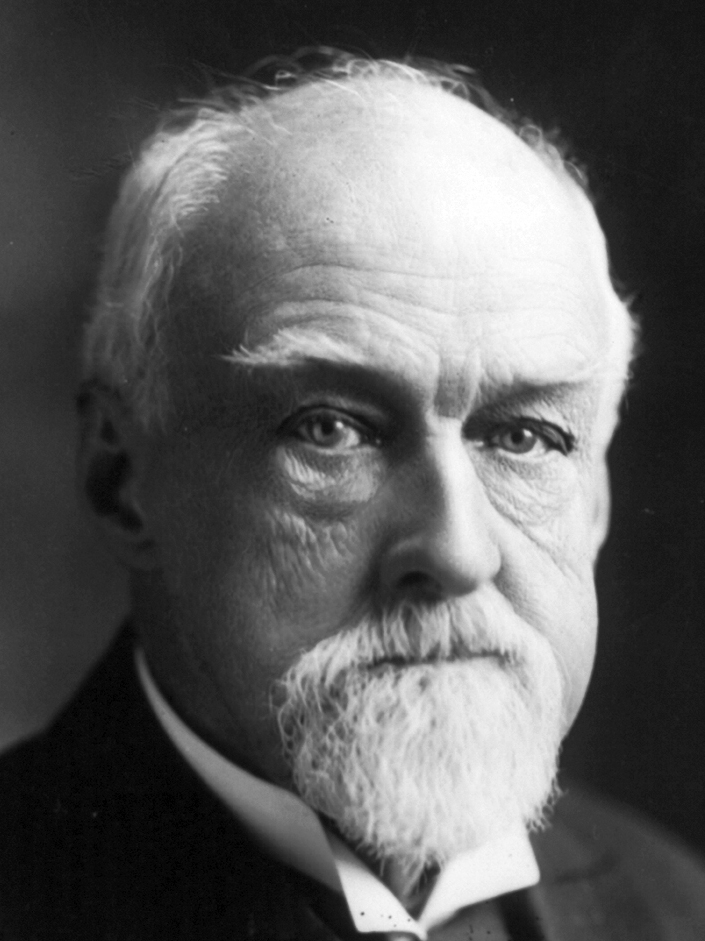

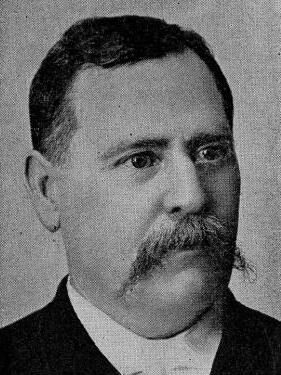
Nominee	Murphy J. Foster	Samuel D. McEnery	Albert Leonard
Party	Independent Democrat	Democratic	Republican
Popular vote	79,407	47,046	29,648
Percentage	44.54%	26.39%	16.63%
Nominee	John E. Breaux	R. H. Tannehill
Party	Independent Republican	Populist
Popular vote	12,409	9,792
Percentage	6.96%	5.49%
- Parish results Foster: 30–40% 40–50% 50–60% 60–70% 70–80% 80–90% >90% McEnery: 30–40% 40–50% 50–60% Leonard: 30–40% 40–50% 50–60% 60–70% 70–80% Breaux: 30–40% 70–80% Tannehill: 40–50% 50–60% 70–80%
Governor before election
Francis T. Nicholls
Democratic
Elected Governor
Murphy J. Foster
Democratic

The 1892 Louisiana gubernatorial election was held on April 19, 1892. Like most Southern states between Reconstruction and the civil rights era, Louisiana's Republican Party was virtually nonexistent in terms of electoral support. In addition, the Republican Party had split into two factions, each supporting a different candidate. As Louisiana had not yet adopted party primaries, this meant that the Democratic Party convention nomination vote was supposed to be the real contest over who would be governor. At the convention, pro-lottery former Governor Samuel D. McEnery was nominated. As a result of the nomination of a pro-lottery candidate, a group of anti-lottery Democrats nominated their own candidate, State Senator Murphy J. Foster. In addition to the four candidates already mentioned, the increasingly popular Populists nominated R. H. Tannehill as their candidate. Despite all of this, Senator Foster was elected with 45% of the vote with a comfortable 19% margin between him and McEnery, who placed second. This election marked the last time until 1979 that the official Democratic Party nominee was defeated.

== Results ==
General Election, April 17

Party	Candidate	Votes received	Percent
Anti-Lottery Democrat	Murphy J. Foster	79,407	44.54%
Democratic	Samuel D. McEnery	47,046	26.39%
Republican	Albert H. Leonard	29,648	16.63%
Independent Republican	John E. Breaux	12,409	6.96%
Populist	R. H. Tannehill	9,792	5.49%

Preceded by 1888 gubernatorial election	Louisiana gubernatorial elections	Succeeded by 1896 gubernatorial election
