= 1900 Louisiana gubernatorial election =

- April 17, 1900
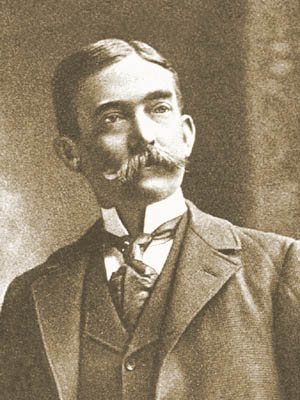

Nominee	William Wright Heard	Donelson Caffery, Jr.
Party	Democratic	Populist
Popular vote	60,206	14,215
Percentage	78.32%	18.49%
- Parish results Heard: 50–60% 60–70% 70–80% 80–90% >90% Caffery: 40–50%
Governor before election
Murphy J. Foster
Democratic
Elected Governor
William Wright Heard
Democratic

The 1900 Louisiana gubernatorial election was held on April 17, 1900. This was the first state election after the adoption of Louisiana's 1898 constitution, which disenfranchised nearly all of the state's Black voters, who had been the core supporters of the Republican Party. The constitution had been prompted by the unusually strong voter support for Republicans and Populists in the 1896 Louisiana gubernatorial election.

With most of its voters disenfranchised, Louisiana's Republican Party had virtually no electoral support, as in most Southern states between Reconstruction and the civil rights era. In addition, a factional split among the few white Republicans who remained meant two different tickets in the governor's race, one (the "Lily-Whites") led by Donelson Caffery, Jr., son of Louisiana Senator Donelson Caffery, who was a Democrat.

As Louisiana had not yet adopted party primaries, this meant that the Democratic Party convention nomination vote was the real contest over who would be governor. The election resulted in the election of Democrat William Wright Heard as governor of Louisiana.

== Results ==
General Election, April 17

Party	Candidate	Votes received	Percent
Democratic	William Wright Heard	60,206	78.32%
Populist/Republican	Donelson Caffery, Jr.	14,215	18.49%
Republican	E. Reems	2,449	3.19%

Preceded by 1896 gubernatorial election	Louisiana gubernatorial elections	Succeeded by 1904 gubernatorial election
