= Claude-Marie Dubufe =

French painter (1790–1864)

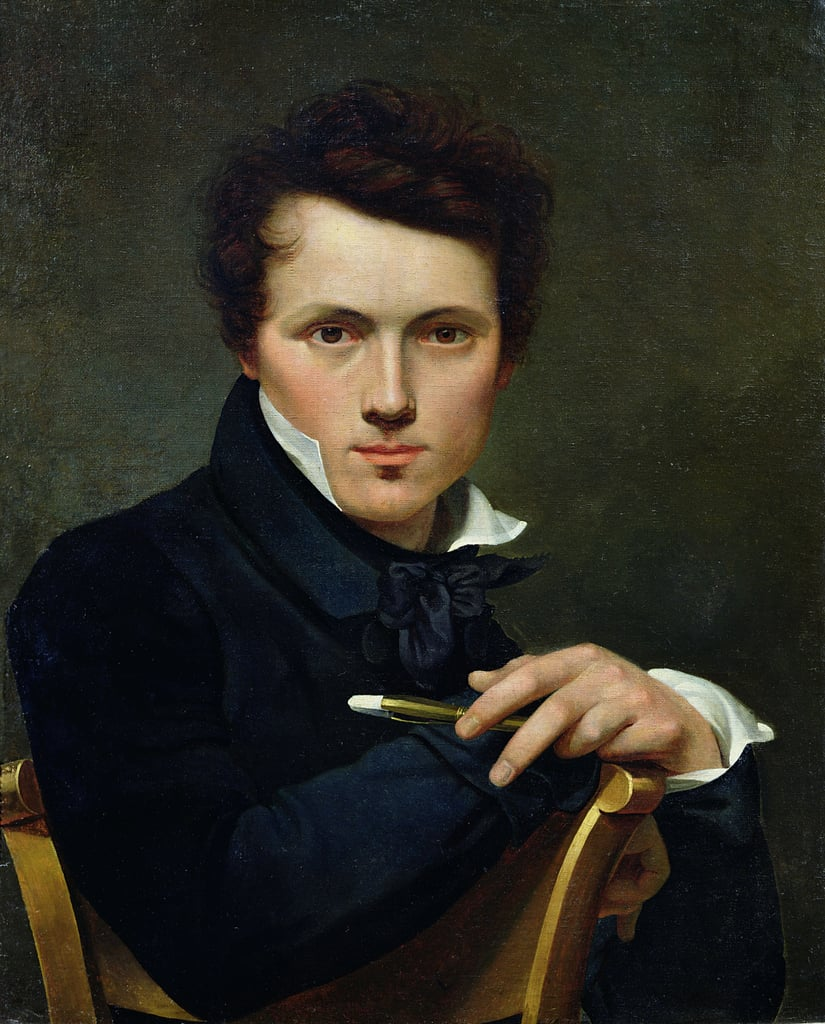
- Self-portrait, c. 1818
- Born: Claude-Marie Dubufe; 1790; Paris, France
- Died: 1864 (aged 73–74); Selle-Saint-Cloud, France
- Education: Jacques-Louis David
- Known for: Genre and portrait painting

Claude-Marie-Paul Dubufe (1790–1864) a French historical, genre and portrait painter, was born in Paris in 1790, and studied under Jacques-Louis David. His subjects were at first classical, and then scriptural. He then gave himself up to the painting of genre pictures and portraits. His reputation rests chiefly on his portraits, of which he produced a large number. Dubufe, who was the last representative of the school of David, died at Selle-Saint-Cloud in 1864.

== Works ==
- A Roman suffering starvation with his family rather than touch a sum of money entrusted to him. 1810.
- Christ allaying the tempest. 1819.
- Apollo and Cyparissus. 1822. (Musée Calvet - Avignon)
- The Birth of the Duke of Bordeaux. 1824. (Orleans Museum.)
- The Passage of the Bidassoa. 1824.
- Four frescoes representing 'Egypt,' &c. (Conseil d'État, Paris.)
- The Surprise. 1828. (National Gallery, London.)
- Portrait of Louis Philippe.
- Portrait of General Montesquiou-Fezenzac (Versailles).
- Portrait of Nicholas Koechlin. 1841.
- Portrait of the Queen of the Belgians.
- Portrait of Virginie de Ternant (Marquise de Dansville-Sur-Meuse) (False River, Louisiana).
- Portrait of Marius Claude Vincent de Ternant (False River, Louisiana).
- Portrait of Marie Virginie Avegno (nee' de Ternant) (False River, Louisiana).
- Portrait of Julie Euriphile de Ternant (False River, Louisiana).
- Portrait of Micaela Almonester, Baroness de Pontalba. 1841.

== Gallery ==
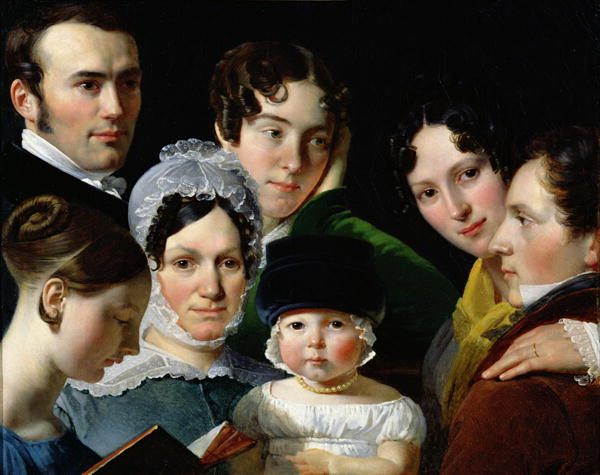
The Dubufe family in 1820 by Claude-Marie Dubufe, with the artist at the right, now in the Louvre. The child in the middle (his son, Édouard) also became a painter

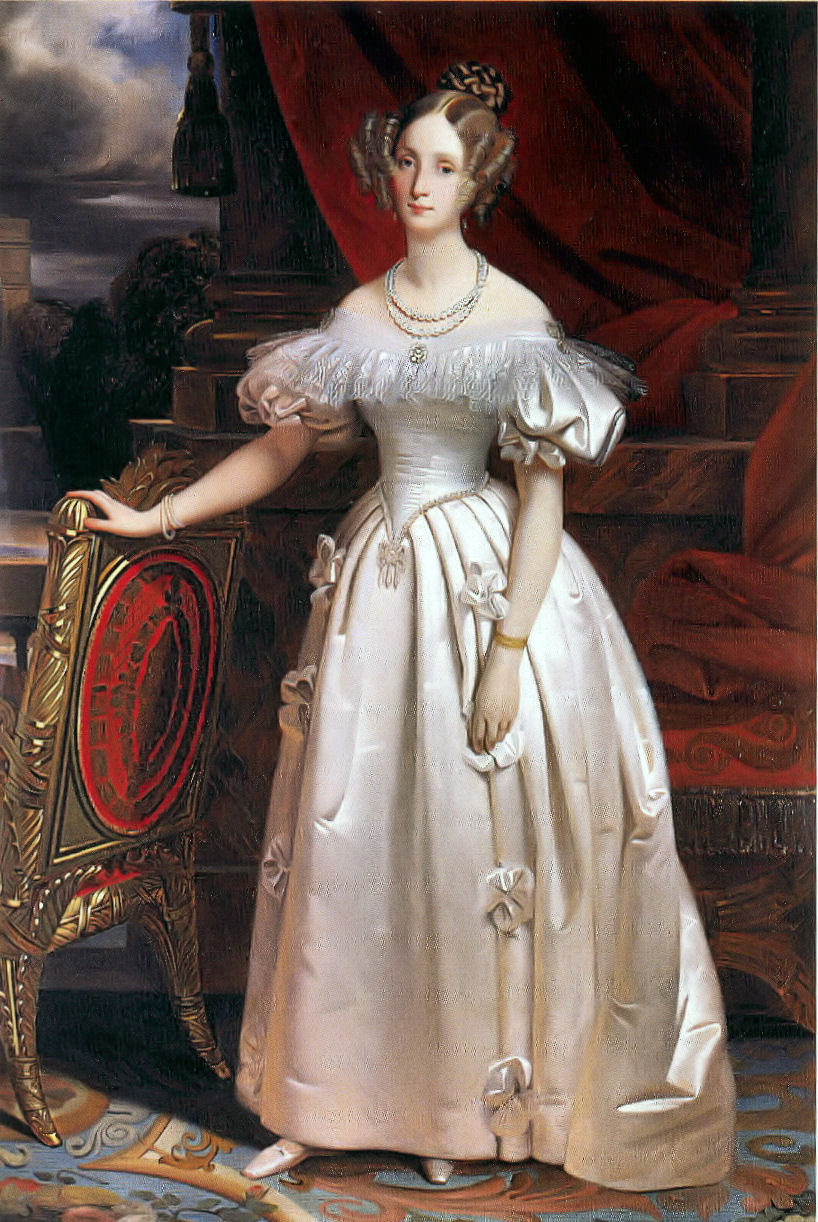
Louise of Orléans

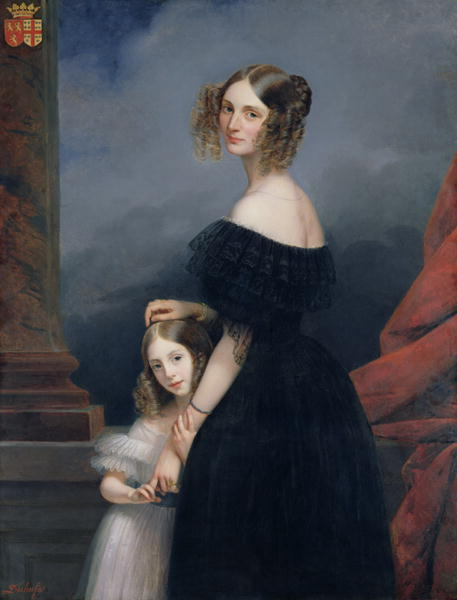
Anne-Louise Alix de Montmorency, with her daughter, ca. 1840

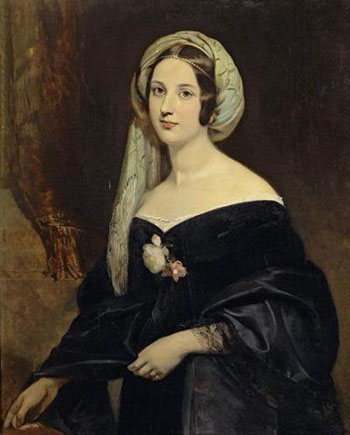
Eleonor Jenkinson
