= 1884 Louisiana gubernatorial election =

- April 22, 1884
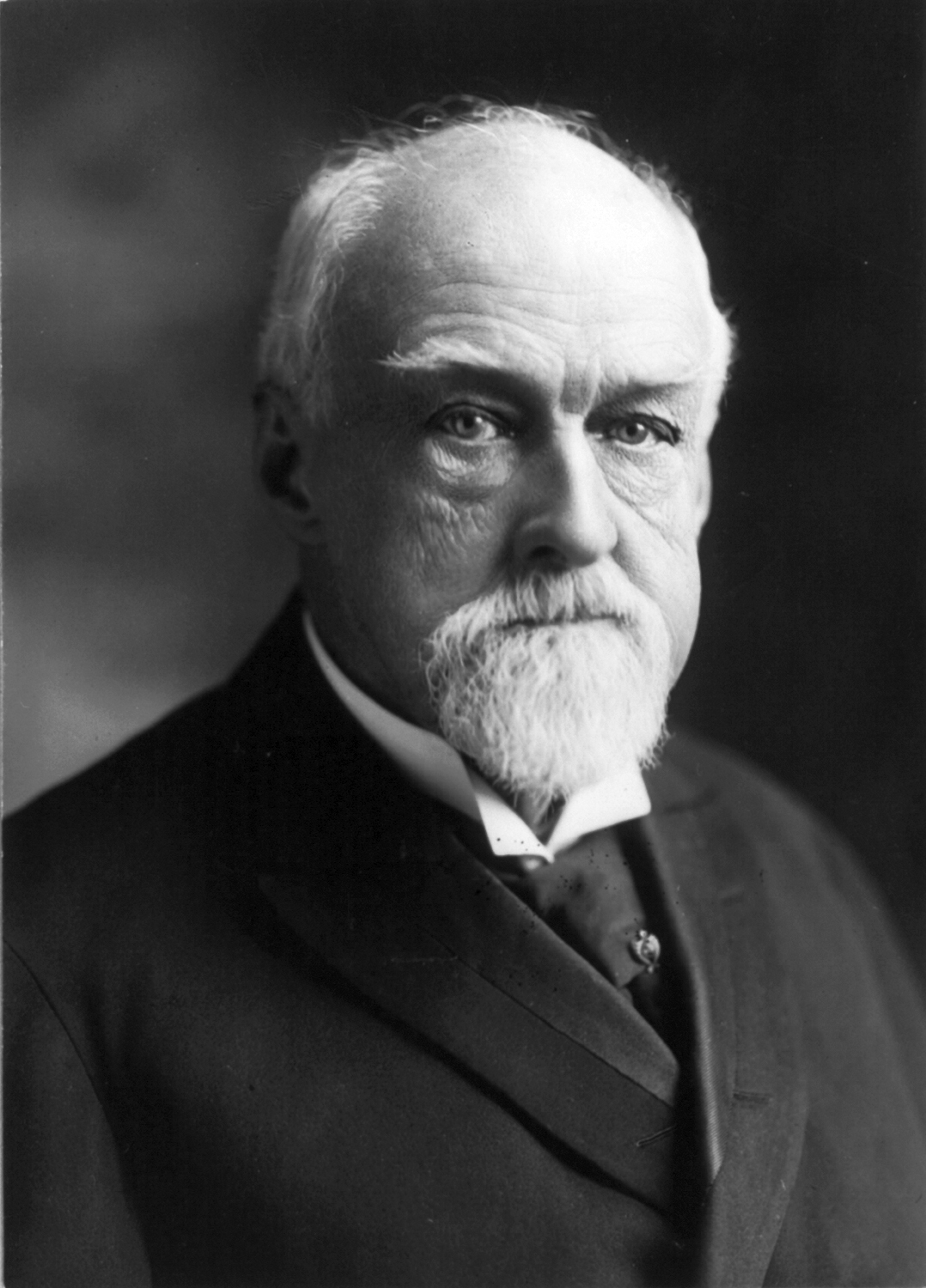

Nominee	Samuel D. McEnery	John Stevenson
Party	Democratic	Republican
Popular vote	88,794	43,502
Percentage	67.12%	32.88%
- Parish Results; McEnery: 50–60% 60–70% 70–80% 80–90% 90–100% Stevenson: 50–60% 60–70% 70–80% 80–90% 90–100%
Governor before election
Samuel D. McEnery
Democratic
Elected Governor
Samuel D. McEnery
Democratic

The 1884 Louisiana gubernatorial election was the second election to take place under the Louisiana Constitution of 1879. Incumbent governor Samuel D. McEnery had been elected Lieutenant Governor in 1879, succeeding Gov. Louis A. Wiltz upon the latter's death in 1881. With assistance from the New Orleans "Ring," McEnery defeated a challenge for nomination from White League chieftain, Frederick Nash Ogden. The election saw widespread intimidation of African Americans which guaranteed the election of the Democratic nominee. As a result, McEnery was elected Governor of Louisiana.

== Results ==
Popular Vote

Party	Candidate	Votes received	Percentage
Democratic	Samuel D. McEnery	88,794	67.12%
Republican	John A. Stevenson	43,502	32.88%
Total Vote		132,296	

Preceded by 1879 Louisiana gubernatorial election	Louisiana gubernatorial elections	Succeeded by 1888 Louisiana gubernatorial election
