= Newton C. Blanchard =

American judge

Newton Crain Blanchard
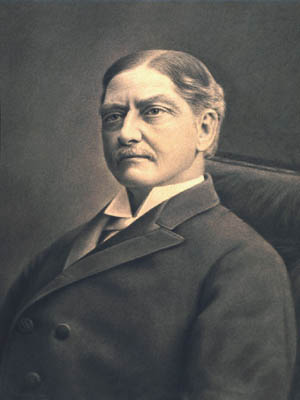

33rd Governor of Louisiana
- In office May 10, 1904 – May 12, 1908
- Lieutenant: Jared Y. Sanders, Sr.
- Preceded by: William Wright Heard
- Succeeded by: Jared Y. Sanders, Sr.

Justice of the Louisiana Supreme Court
- In office 1897–1903
- Succeeded by: Alfred D. Land

United States Senator from Louisiana
- In office March 12, 1894 – March 3, 1897
- Preceded by: Edward D. White
- Succeeded by: Samuel D. McEnery

Member of the U.S. House of Representatives from Louisiana's 4th district
- In office March 4, 1881 – March 12, 1894
- Preceded by: Joseph B. Elam
- Succeeded by: Henry W. Ogden

Personal details
- Born: January 29, 1849 Rapides Parish, Louisiana
- Died: June 22, 1922 (aged 73) Shreveport, Louisiana
- Resting place: Greenwood Cemetery in Shreveport
- Party: Democratic
- Education: Tulane University Law School
- Occupation: Attorney

Newton Crain Blanchard (January 29, 1849 – June 22, 1922) was a United States representative, U.S. senator, and the 33rd governor of Louisiana.

== Personal life ==
Born in Rapides Parish in Central Louisiana, he completed academic studies, studied law in Alexandria in 1868, and graduated from the Tulane University Law School in 1870 (then named the University of Louisiana). He was admitted to the bar and commenced practice in Shreveport in 1871; in 1879 he was a delegate to the State constitutional convention.

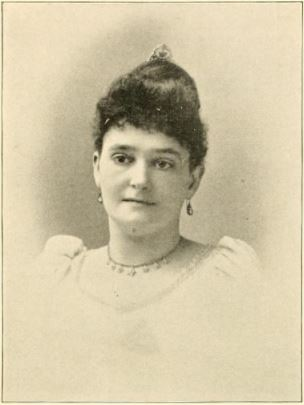
Mary Emma Barrett

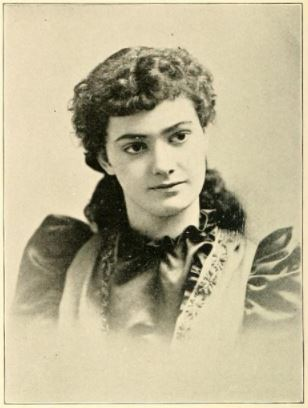
Mary Ethel Blanchard

In 1873 he married Mary Emma Barrett, the daughter of Capt. William W. Barrett, an officer in the Confederate army. Their daughter, Mary Ethel Blanchard, married Leonard Rutherford Smith.

== Political career ==
Blanchard was elected as a Democrat to the 47th and to the six succeeding Congresses and served from March 4, 1881, until his resignation, effective March 12, 1894. While in the House of Representatives, he was chairman of the Committee on Rivers and Harbors (50th through 53rd Congresses). He was appointed and subsequently elected as a Democrat to the U.S. Senate to fill the vacancy caused by the resignation of Edward Douglass White, who was appointed to the United States Supreme Court. Blanchard served in the Senate from March 12, 1894, to March 3, 1897; he was not a candidate for a full term in 1896. While in the Senate, Blanchard was chairman of the Committee on Improvement of the Mississippi River and its Tributaries (Fifty-third Congress).

Elected associate justice of the Louisiana Supreme Court, Blanchard served from 1897 to 1903, when he resigned. Blanchard became the Democratic nominee for governor in 1904. He was elected and was governor from 1904 to 1908, and thereafter resumed the practice of law in Shreveport. Notably, he represented Louisiana in President Theodore Roosevelt's 1908 White House Conference of Governors though his term had ended only a day earlier. At this conference, he introduced a resolution for each state to create a commission for the conservation of natural resources. The resolution was unanimously approved, and Louisiana became the first state to create such a commission.

As governor, he appointed Sheriff David Theophilus Stafford of Rapides Parish, a son of Leroy Augustus Stafford, a Confederate brigadier general mortally wounded in the American Civil War, as the Louisiana adjutant general. Various reforms were also introduced including a minimum wage law.

In 1913, Blanchard was again a member of the State constitutional convention, this time serving as president. He died in Shreveport in 1922 and was interred at Greenwood Cemetery.

Party political offices
Preceded by William Wright Heard	Democratic nominee for Governor of Louisiana; 1904	Succeeded by Jared Y. Sanders Sr.
U.S. House of Representatives
Preceded by Joseph Barton Elam	Member of the U.S. House of Representatives from Louisiana's 4th congressional district 1881–1894	Succeeded by Henry Warren Ogden
U.S. Senate
Preceded by Edward D. White	U.S. senator (Class 3) from Louisiana; 1894–1897; Served alongside: Donelson Caffery	Succeeded by Samuel D. McEnery
Political offices
Preceded by William Wright Heard	Governor of Louisiana; 1900–1904	Succeeded by Jared Y. Sanders Sr.
