= Hiram R. Lott =

American politician (1829–1895)

22nd Lieutenant Governor of Louisiana
- In office 1893–1895
- Governor: Murphy J. Foster
- Preceded by: Charles Parlange
- Succeeded by: Robert H. Snyder

Member of the Louisiana State Senate
- In office 1879–1895
- In office 1859–1867

Personal details
- Born: Hiram Richard Lott; April 4, 1829 Covington, Mississippi, U.S.
- Died: June 2, 1895 (aged 66) Managua, Nicaragua
- Party: Democratic
- Spouse: Mary Elizabeth Williams (m. 1847)

Hiram Richard Lott (April 4, 1829 – June 2, 1895) was a Louisiana politician who served as a State Senator and later became the lieutenant governor of Louisiana. He had an interest in a Nicaragua Canal and became consul to Nicaragua. He died in Managua.

He represented Madison Parish and West Carroll Parish.

Political offices
Preceded by Charles Parlange	Lieutenant Governor of Louisiana; 1893–1895	Succeeded by Robert H. Snyder
