= Harriet Campbell Foss =

American painter (1860–1938)

- Born: 1860; Middletown, Connecticut
- Died: June 29, 1938 (aged 77–78); Darien, Connecticut
- Known for: Painting

Harriet Campbell Foss (1860 – June 29, 1938) was an American painter.

== Biography ==
Foss was born in Middletown, Connecticut, the daughter of Archibald Campbell Foss, a Methodist minister who taught at Wesleyan University. He died in 1869 while the family was traveling in Europe, and his wife returned with the three children to the United States. She graduated from Wilberham Academy and attended Smith College for one year before pursuing her artistic education at Cooper Union, during which time she also studied with J. Alden Weir. Beginning in the late 1880s she lived for five years in Paris, studying there with Alfred Stevens and attending William Bouguereau's classes at the Académie Julian and those of Gustave Courtois at the Académie Colarossi.

She is known to have exhibited at the Paris Salon as early as 1887, appearing there again in 1892 before her return to New York. She also submitted paintings to the National Academy of Design for exhibition in 1890 and 1892, signing the latter work "H. Campbell Foss" in an attempt to obscure her gender. She taught drawing and painting at the Woman's College of Baltimore, now Goucher College, from 1892 until 1895; in 1899, when she showed a piece at the Royal Academy in London, she gave an address in Paris once more. Foss exhibited her work at the Palace of Fine Arts at the 1893 World's Columbian Exposition in Chicago, Illinois. In 1900 she exhibited a piece at the Exposition Universelle.

Beginning in 1905 Foss maintained a New York studio and a home in Stamford, Connecticut; in 1909 she moved to Darien, becoming active with the Seven Arts League. She died at home in Darien, leaving her sister Caroline Foss as survivor. During her career she worked in both oils and pastels.

An 1892 painting by Foss, The Flower Maker, was included in the inaugural exhibition of the National Museum of Women in the Arts, American Women Artists 1830–1930, in 1987.

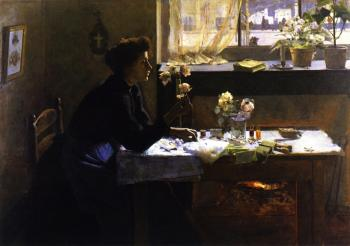
The Flower Maker by Harriet Campbell Foss, 1892
