= 1896 Louisiana gubernatorial election =

- April 21, 1896
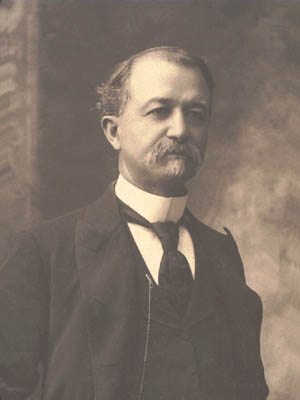

Nominee	Murphy J. Foster	John N. Pharr
Party	Democratic	Republican
Alliance	-	Lily-White; Populist
Popular vote	116,116	87,698
Percentage	56.92%	42.99%
- Parish results Foster: 50–60% 60–70% 70–80% 80–90% >90% Pharr: 50–60% 60–70% 70–80%

The 1896 Louisiana gubernatorial election was held on April 21, 1896. Like most Southern states between Reconstruction and the civil rights era, Louisiana's Republican Party was virtually nonexistent in terms of electoral support. As Louisiana had not yet adopted party primaries, this meant that the Democratic Party convention nomination vote was supposed to be the real contest over who would be governor. However, the Republicans and Populists put forward a joint candidate, John N. Pharr. With combined Republican and Populist support Pharr garnered 43% of the vote, although the Democratic nominee, Murphy J. Foster was elected with 57% of the vote.

Foster was the last Louisiana governor to be elected to consecutive terms until John McKeithen in 1964 and 1968.

== Results ==
General Election, April 17

Party	Candidate	Votes received	Percent
Democratic	Murphy J. Foster	116,116	56.92%
Populist/Republican	John N. Pharr	87,698	42.99%
Independent	A. B. Booth	176	0.09%

Preceded by 1892 gubernatorial election	Louisiana gubernatorial elections	Succeeded by 1900 gubernatorial election
