= Frederick Nash Ogden =

Confederate soldier and White Leaguer

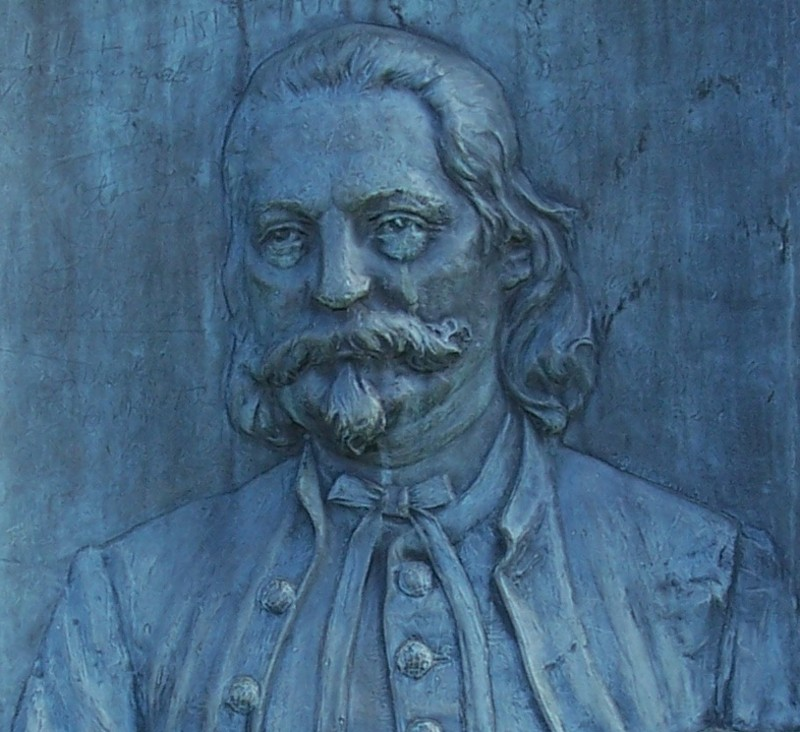
Bronze relief of Ogden sculpted in 1921

Frederick Nash Ogden (January 25, 1837 – May 25, 1886) was a Confederate officer and leading white supremacist organizer of New Orleans, Louisiana. He was a major in the 8th Louisiana Heavy Artillery Battalion during the Siege of Vicksburg. He then led the 9th Louisiana Cavalry Regiment, a mounted infantry unit known as Ogden's Cavalry. After the war he became a leading White Leaguer and was involved in the Battle of Liberty Place. He was an unsuccessful candidate to be Democratic nominee for governor of Louisiana in 1884.

He became known as General Fred Ogden and the Louisiana State Museum obtained a dress sword he was presented. It also obtained a few of his papers.

He served as president of the Crescent City White League shortly after its founding.

A bronze relief was made of him by George T. Brewster in 1921 for his role at Vicksburg. His funeral was a major event attended by political leaders. A road in New Orleans was named for him.
