= Pusey, Haute-Saône =

Pusey
- Commune
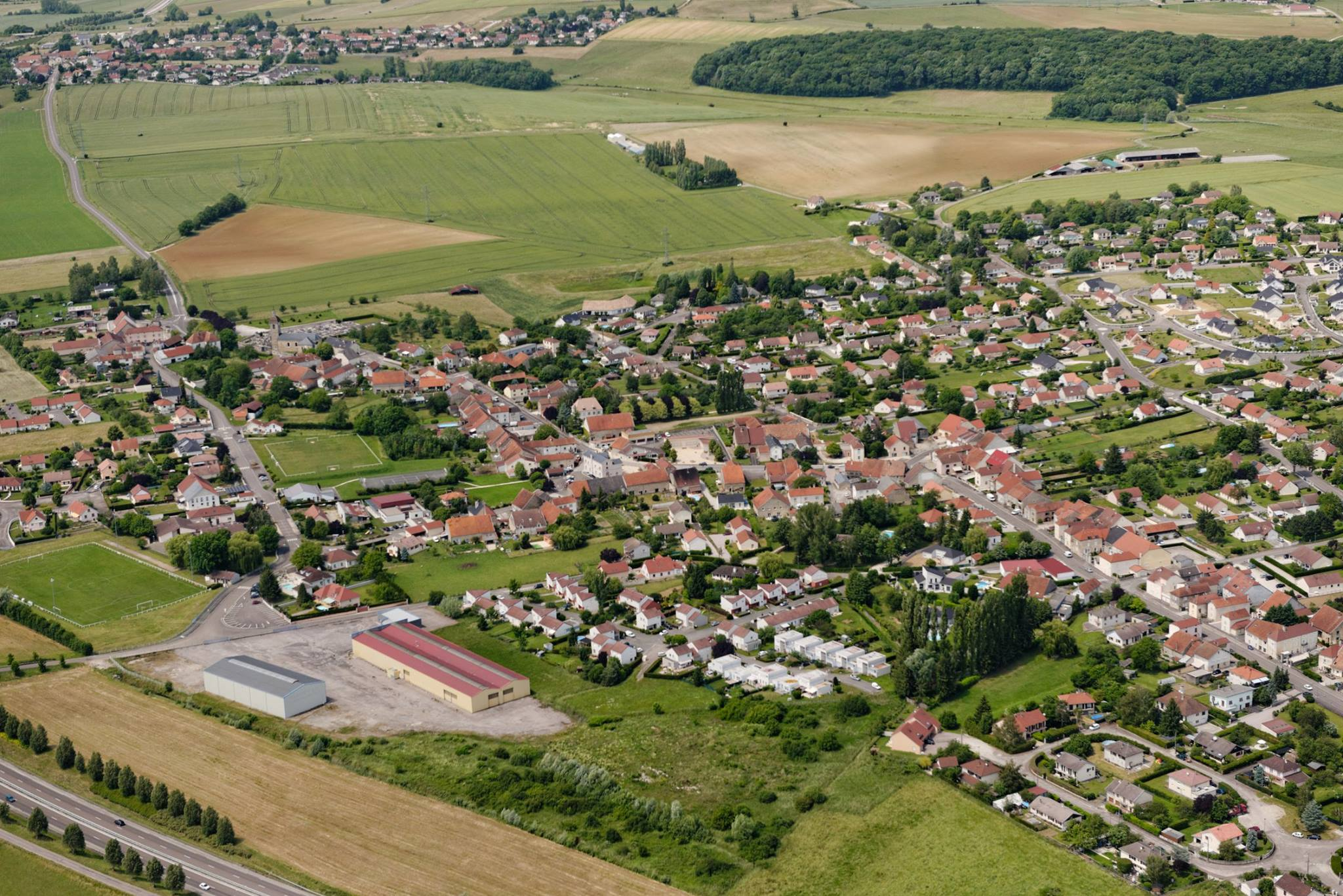
- Aerial view of Pusey

- Coat of arms
- Location of Pusey
- Location within France Location within Bourgogne-Franche-Comté
- Coordinates: 47°39′13″N 6°07′38″E
- Country: France
- Region: Bourgogne-Franche-Comté
- Department: Haute-Saône
- Arrondissement: Vesoul
- Canton: Vesoul-1
- Intercommunality: CA Vesoul

Government
  - Mayor (2020–2026): Jean-Jacques Polien
- Area^{1}: 8.18 km^{2} (3.16 sq mi)
- Highest elevation: 266 m (873 ft)
- Lowest elevation: 213 m (699 ft)
- Population (2023): 1,432
  - Density: 175/km^{2} (453/sq mi)
- Time zone: UTC+01:00 (CET)
  - Summer (DST): UTC+02:00 (CEST)
- INSEE/Postal code: 70428 /70000
- ^{1} French Land Register data, which excludes lakes, ponds, glaciers > 1 km^{2} (0.386 sq mi or 247 acres) and river estuaries.

Pusey (French pronunciation: [pyzɛ]) is a commune in the Haute-Saône department in the region of Bourgogne-Franche-Comté in eastern France.

The town is located near Vesoul.

== See also ==
- Communes of the Haute-Saône department
- Communauté d'agglomération de Vesoul
- Arrondissement of Vesoul
