= 9th Louisiana Cavalry Regiment =

- Active: January, 1865–May 12, 1865
- Country: Confederate States of America
- Allegiance: Confederate States Army
- Branch: Cavalry
- Type: Regiment
- Nickname: Ogden's Cavalry
- Engagements: American Civil War

Commanders
- Notable commanders: Colonel Frederick N. Ogden

The 9th Louisiana Cavalry Regiment, also known as Ogden's Cavalry, was a Confederate unit in the American Civil War. The unit was commanded by Colonel Frederick Nash Ogden. Although the unit was called a cavalry regiment, it was more properly classified as a mounted infantry unit.

== History ==
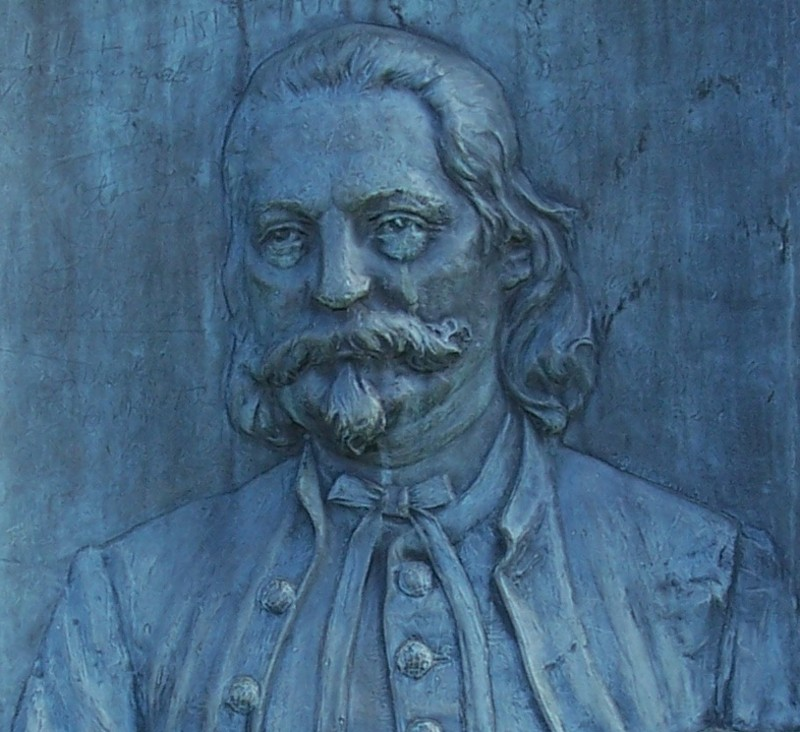
Bronze of Colonel Ogden

The regiment was organized in January 1865 in Mississippi, under the command of Colonel Ogden. Colonel Ogden was a veteran of the Siege of Vicksburg. During that battle, then-Major Ogden had served in the 8th Louisiana Heavy Artillery Battalion from March 29-July 3, 1863.

When this new cavalry unit was formed, Ogden received under his command three or four companies from Gober's Regiment of Mounted Infantry, three companies formerly with the 14th Confederate Cavalry Regiment, one company from his own temporary battalion, and two recently organized companies. Because of their familiarity with the countryside these two new companies, G and H, and possibly one or more of the others, operated along the lower Amite River and near the Mississippi River south of Baton Rouge, Louisiana until about April, 1865. The other companies participated in the marches and engagements of Colonel John Scott's cavalry brigade in northern and central Mississippi. In April 1865, the companies all united near Meridian, Mississippi. The unit surrendered on May 4, 1865 at Citronelle, Alabama. Most of its troops were paroled on May 12, 1865 at Gainesville, Alabama.

== Companies ==
Company	Name	Parish of Origin	Commander
A	New River Rangers (formerly Co. B Cage's Battalion)	Ascension	Capt. Joseph Gonzales
B	Skipwith Guards (formerly Co. A 27th Infantry)	East Feliciana	Capt. Joseph A. Norwood
C	Plains Store Rangers (formerly Co. C Cage's Battalion)	East Baton Rouge	Capt. Gilbert C. Mills
D	Spencer Guards (formerly Co. H 27th Infantry)	St. Helena	Capt. Thaddeus C.S. Robertson
E	Mullen's Scouts & Sharpshooters (formerly Co. H 14th Confed. Cavalry)	Orleans	Capt. Louis S. Greenlee
F	(formerly Co. F Powers' Regiment)	East Feliciana	Capt. Tully R. Brady
G		Ascension	Capt. H. R. Doyal
H		Iberville	Capt. Joseph U. Babin
I	(formerly Co. A Ogden's Battalion)	East Baton Rouge	Capt. Joseph Hinson
K	Baton Rouge Invincibles (formerly Co. B 9th Infantry)	East Baton Rouge	Capt. B. F. Burnett

== See also ==
- Louisiana Civil War Confederate Units
- Lists of American Civil War Regiments by State
