= 1888 Louisiana gubernatorial election =

- April 17, 1888
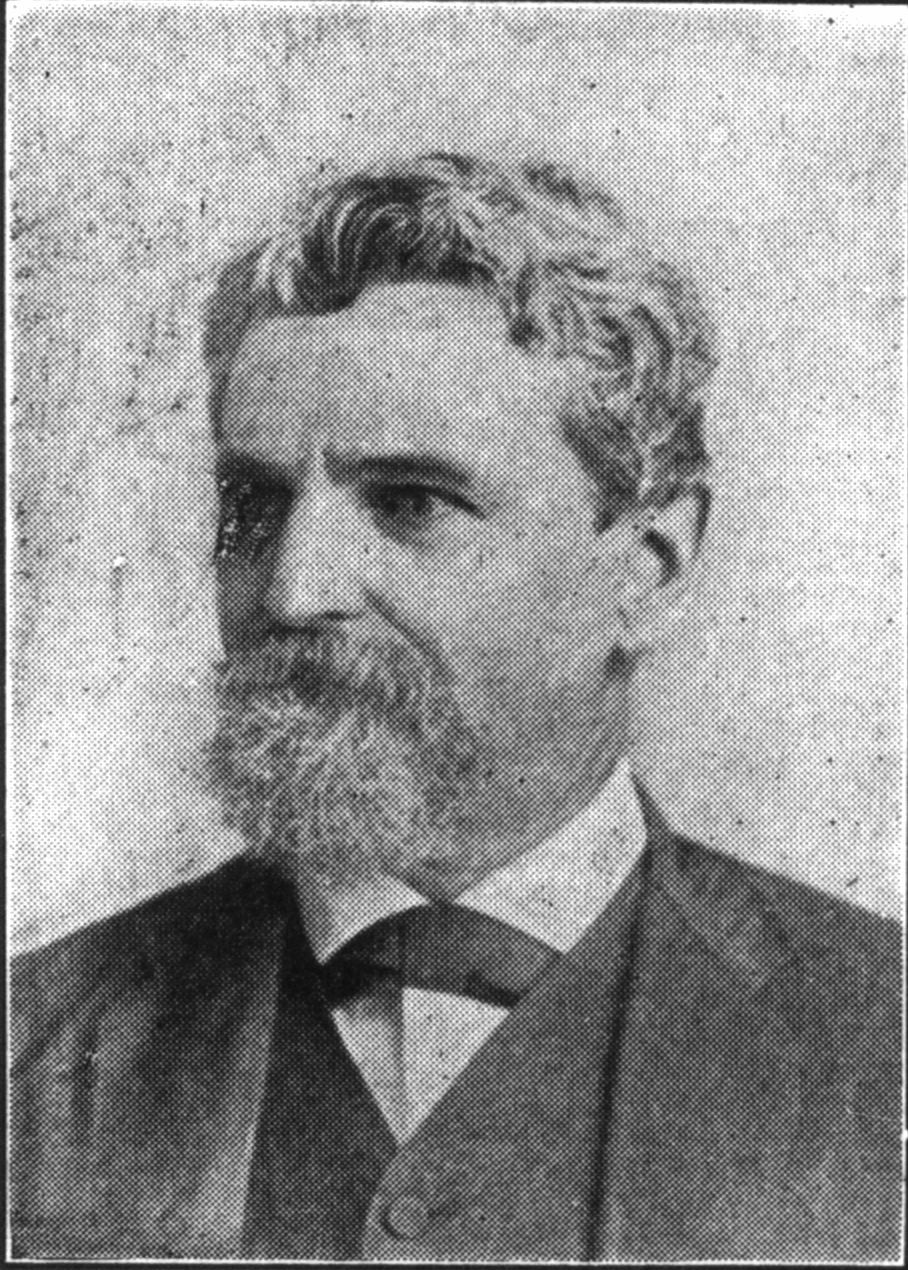

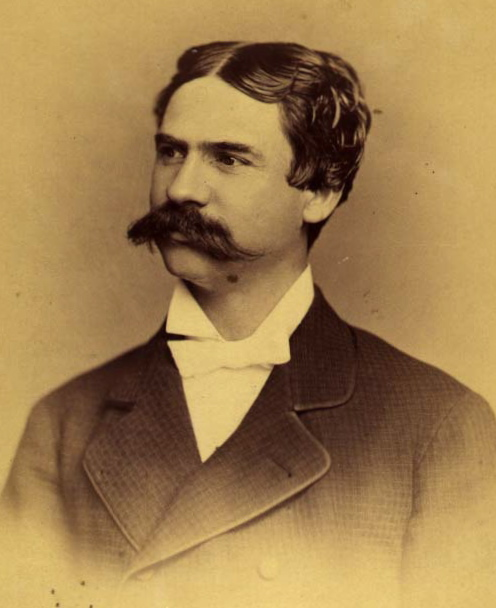
Nominee	Francis T. Nicholls	Henry C. Warmoth
Party	Democratic	Republican
Popular vote	137,257	51,471
Percentage	72.72%	27.28%
- Parish results Nicholls: 50–60% 60–70% 70–80% 80–90% >90% Warmoth: 50–60% 60–70% 70–80% 80–90%
Governor before election
Samuel D. McEnery
Democratic
Elected Governor
Francis T. Nicholls
Democratic

The 1888 Louisiana gubernatorial election was the second election to take place under the Louisiana Constitution of 1879. As a result of this election Francis T. Nicholls was re-elected Governor of Louisiana. The election saw widespread intimidation of African Americans which guaranteed the election of the Democratic nominee.

== Results ==
Popular Vote

Party	Candidate	Votes received	Percentage
Democratic	Francis T. Nicholls	137,257	72.72%
Republican	Henry C. Warmoth	51,471	27.28%
Total Vote		188,728	

Preceded by 1884 Louisiana gubernatorial election	Louisiana gubernatorial elections	Succeeded by 1892 Louisiana gubernatorial election
