= Maurice Denuzière =

French writer and journalist (1926–2025)

Maurice Denuzière (29 August 1926 – 2 November 2025) was a French journalist and writer.

== Life and career ==
Denuzière was born in Saint-Étienne on 29 August 1926. After studying journalism and a career in naval aeronautics, he embarked on journalism. In 1951, he became a chronicler for France-Soir and Le Monde. Passionate about writing, he was the author of several best sellers. Now that he had become a rather famous author, he was best known for his novel suite entitled Louisiana, in 6 volumes (1977–1987).

He was appointed a commandeur in the Ordre des Arts et des Lettres in January 2010.

Denuzière died in Dijon on 2 November 2025, at the age of 99.

== Novels ==
- Série Louisiane:
  - 1977: Louisiane, (volume I), JC Lattès ISBN 978-2213620008
  - 1979: Fausse-Rivière, (volume II), JC Lattès
  - 1981: Bagatelle, (volume III), JC Lattès
  - 1985: Les Trois Chênes, (volume IV), Denoël
  - 1987: L'Adieu au Sud, (volume V), Denoël
  - 1987: Les années Louisiane, (volume VI), Denoël
- Série Helvétie:
  - 1992: Helvétie, (volume I)
  - 1994: Rive-Reine, (volume II)
  - 1996: Romandie, (volume III)
  - 1998: Beauregard, (volume IV)
- Série Bahamas:
  - 2003: Le Pont de Buena Vista, (volume I), Fayard
  - 2005: Retour à Soledad, (volume II), Fayard
  - 2007: Un paradis perdu, (volume III), Fayard

=== Other novels ===
- 1959: Les Trois Dés, Éditions Julliard
- 1960: Une tombe en Toscane, Éditions Julliard
- 1961: L’Anglaise et le hibou, Éditions Julliard
- 1974: Comme un hibou au soleil, JC Lattès
- 2003: Pour amuser les coccinelles, Fayard
- 1979: Un chien de saison, JC Lattès
- 1982: Pour amuser les coccinelles, JC Lattès
- 1988: L'Amour flou, Denoël
- 2000: Le Cornac, Fayard
- 2001: Amélie ou la concordance des temps, Fayard
- 2009: L'Alsacienne, Fayard
- 2011: Un homme sans ambition, Fayard

== Trivia ==
Boulevard des Italiens (1875-1975), Photos by John Craven, Draeger

- 1973: Enquête sur la fraude fiscale, JC Lattès
- 1973: Lettres de l’étranger, chronicles, JC Lattès
- 1963: Les Délices du port, essay, Ed. Fleurus
- 1982: Alerte en Stéphanie, tale, Hachette Jeunesse
- 1986: La trahison des apparences, short stories, Ed. de l’Amitié
- 1990: Je te nomme Louisiane, narrative, Denoël
- 1998: Et pourtant elle tourne, chronicles, Fayard
- 1990: La Louisiane: du coton au pétrole, Denoël
- 2010: Du Mississippi au Léman, itinéraire historique, l'Aire
- 2013: La Dix-Huitième Etoile, histoire de la Louisiane américaine, Fayard
