= Murphy J. Foster =

American politician

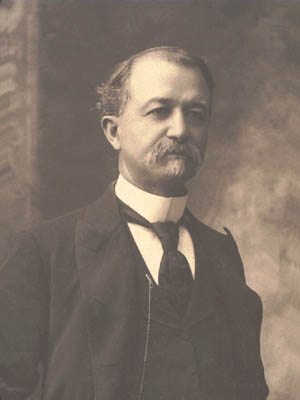

United States Senator from Louisiana
- In office March 4, 1901 – March 3, 1913
- Preceded by: Donelson Caffery
- Succeeded by: Joseph E. Ransdell

31st Governor of Louisiana
- In office May 10, 1892 – May 8, 1900
- Lieutenant: Charles Parlange; Hiram R. Lott; Robert H. Snyder
- Preceded by: Francis T. Nicholls
- Succeeded by: William Wright Heard

Member of the Louisiana State Senate from the 10th district
- In office 1880–1892

Personal details
- Born: Murphy James Foster; January 12, 1849 Franklin, Louisiana, U.S.
- Died: June 12, 1921 (aged 72) Franklin, Louisiana, U.S.
- Party: Democratic
- Spouses: Florence Daisy Hine Foster (m. 1877; died 1877) Rose Routh Ker Foster (m. 1881)
- Children: 10
- Relatives: Mike Foster (grandson)
- Education: Washington and Lee University; Cumberland College (BA); University of Louisiana (LLB)

Murphy James Foster (January 12, 1849 – June 12, 1921) was the 31st governor of the U.S. state of Louisiana, an office he held for two terms from 1892 to 1900. Foster supported the Louisiana Constitution of 1898, which effectively disfranchised the black majority, who were mostly Republicans. This led to Louisiana becoming a one-party Democratic state for several generations and excluding African Americans from the political system.

Louisiana followed Mississippi (1890) and other southern states in adopting a new constitution with devices to disfranchise blacks, then a majority in the state, chiefly by making voter registration more difficult. This situation of discriminatory political exclusion was not corrected until after enforcement of constitutional rights by the federal government under the Voting Rights Act of 1965.

== Early life ==
Foster was born in 1849 on his family's sugar cane plantation near Franklin, the seat of St. Mary Parish, to Thomas J. Foster and the former Martha P. Murphy. His father owned fifty slaves in 1860, marking him as a major planter. Murphy Foster was educated in public schools and attended Washington and Lee University in Lexington, Virginia, and graduated from Cumberland University in Lebanon, Tennessee in 1870. He studied law at the University of Louisiana (later Tulane University) in New Orleans and was admitted to the bar in 1871 during the Reconstruction era (United States).

In 1879, Foster "was elected member of the John McEnery legislature, but owing to the fact that this government was never recognized and that the Kellogg government was, did not take his seat."

On May 15, 1877, Foster married Florence Daisy Hine, the daughter of Franklin merchant T.D. Hine. She died on August 26, 1877, at age 19. In 1881, he married Rose Routh Ker, daughter of Captain John Ker and the former Rose Routh of Ouida Plantation in West Feliciana Parish near Baton Rouge. The couple had ten children, nine of whom lived to maturity. These included Murphy James Foster II, the father of future Governor Murphy (Mike) Foster.

== Road to governorship ==
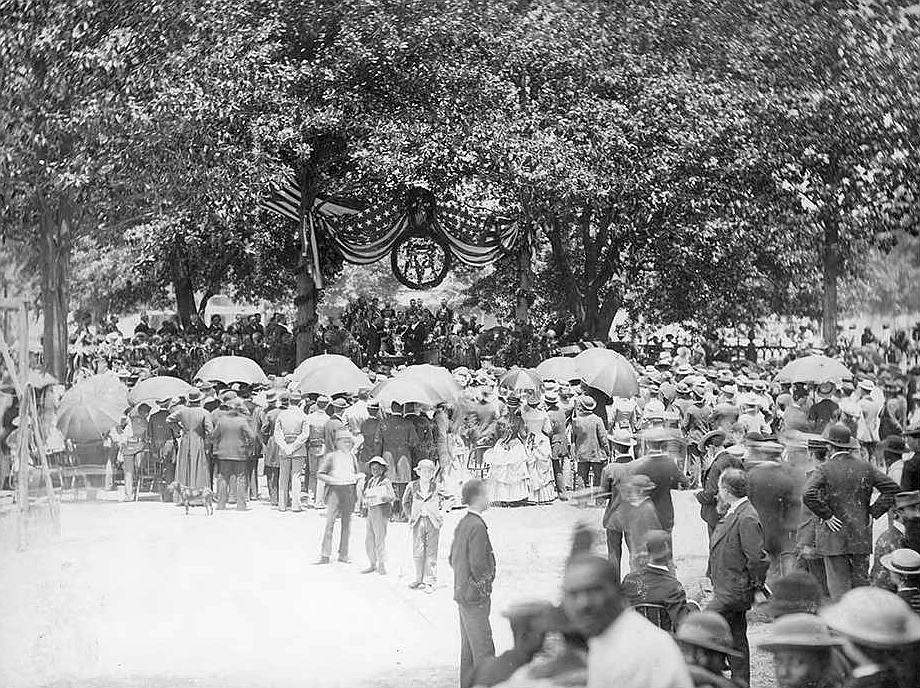
Inauguration at the State House, 1892

Prior to being elected and serving as governor, Foster served as a state senator from 1880 to 1892. In 1892, he was elected governor as the Democratic Party nominee, and he had the support of the Farmer's Alliance, a populist group, as well.

== First term as governor ==
His lieutenant governors were Charles Parlange and Hiram R. Lott, during his first term, and Robert H. Snyder of Tensas Parish in the second term.

Foster appointed Thomas M. Wade of Newellton, another Tensas Parish legislator, to the state board of education. Wade later served as the long-term Tensas Parish school superintendent.

Foster appointed William B. Bailey, the co-founder of the Lafayette Daily Advertiser and the former mayor of Lafayette as the clerk of the state district court for Lafayette Parish.

In 1896, Foster directed state troopers to forcefully overthrow Louisiana's last enclave of Republican and African-American office holders in St. John the Baptist Parish.

== Challenge by John N. Pharr and second term ==
In the 1896 general election, Foster was re-elected as the incumbent. He defeated the Republican-Populist fusion candidate John Newton Pharr (1829–1903), a sugar planter from St. Mary Parish. Lewis Strong Clarke, a neighboring sugar planter from St. Mary Parish, directed the Pharr campaign. Pharr had possibly gained a majority of votes cast and won twenty-six of the then fifty-nine parishes, with his greatest strength in north central Louisiana and the Florida Parishes to the east of Baton Rouge.

With the assistance of the Regular Democratic Organization political machine based in New Orleans, Foster officially received 116,116 votes (57 percent) to Pharr's 87,698 ballots (43 percent). The election, however, suffered heavily from fraud which benefited Foster, and widespread violence to suppress black Republican voting. A clear accounting of the election results is probably not possible.

Subsequently, as governor, Foster signed off on the new Louisiana Constitution of 1898, establishing a variety of voter registration requirements that would "disenfranchise blacks, Republicans, and white Populists." (All of these categories of voters had voted overwhelmingly for John N. Pharr, and similar coalitions gained governorships and/or congressional seats in some southern states. The new constitution ensured that Louisiana would become a one-party state, and it was part of the "Solid South" Democratic hegemony for the next six decades.)

After Foster's reelection in 1896, Louisiana general elections were non-competitive; the only competition took place in Democratic primaries. Voter rolls were sharply reduced by the new initiatives, and blacks and other groups were excluded from the political system. The white-controlled legislature imposed racial segregation and Jim Crow. As an example of the changed politics, by 1908 when John N. Pharr's son Henry Newton Pharr (eponym of Pharr, Texas) sought the Louisiana governorship as a Republican, he gained just 11.1 percent, of a much reduced proportion of voters in comparison to his father's campaign against Foster in 1896.

== Senator and customs official ==
After leaving the office of governor in 1900, Foster was elected by the state legislature as a U.S. senator. He served until 1913, when he lost the Democratic nomination. Thereafter, he was appointed as the customs collector in New Orleans by President Woodrow Wilson. This Southerner achieved office because he gained an Electoral College bonus following disfranchisement of blacks in the South and hobbling of the Republican Party.

== Death ==
Foster died on June 12, 1921, on the Dixie Plantation near Franklin, some nine years before his grandson and namesake, a future governor of the state, was born.

== Legacy ==
He was a member of The Boston Club of New Orleans.

Foster worked to maintain white supremacy in Louisiana through his support of the Louisiana Constitution of 1898, which practically disfranchised blacks. He also led the fight which succeeded in outlawing the Louisiana Lottery Co. Foster fought for the interest of sugar growers and supported flood-control legislation and the regulation of railway rates.

Foster was the last governor of Louisiana to serve two consecutive 4-year terms until John J. McKeithen, who served from 1964 to 1972. (Note: In the meantime Earl K. Long served part of one term and all of two other terms, but the terms were not consecutive; Jimmie Davis served two nonconsecutive 4-year terms.)

Because blacks were disfranchised under Foster's administration, Democratic candidates in the state did not encounter serious challenges from Republicans until 1963. At the beginning of a realignment of party identification in the South, that year McKeithen was challenged by Republican Charlton Lyons. Since the late 20th century, the former Confederate states, where whites constitute a majority, have since generally elected Republican national candidates.

In 1997, Foster was posthumously inducted into the Louisiana Political Museum and Hall of Fame in Winnfield.

His grandson, Murphy J. Foster Jr., served as a Republican governor of the state from 1996 to 2004. "Mike" Foster is technically Murphy J. Foster III, but he used the term "Jr." instead.

== Notes ==
Party political offices
Preceded by Samuel D. McEnery	Democratic nominee for Governor of Louisiana; 1896	Succeeded by William Wright Heard
Political offices
Preceded by Francis T. Nicholls	Governor of Louisiana; 1892–1900	Succeeded by William W. Heard
U.S. Senate
Preceded by Donelson Caffery	US Senator (Class 2) from Louisiana; 1901–1913	Succeeded by Joseph E. Ransdell
