= William Wright Heard =

American politician (1853–1926)

William Wright (W. W.) Heard
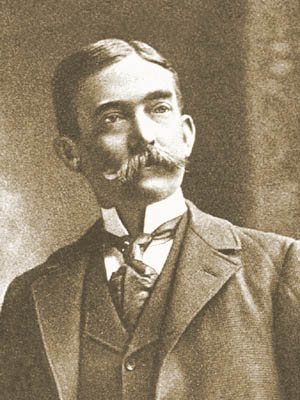

32nd Governor of Louisiana
- In office May 8, 1900 – May 10, 1904
- Lieutenant: Albert Estopinal
- Preceded by: Murphy J. Foster, Sr.
- Succeeded by: Newton C. Blanchard

Louisiana State Representative from Union Parish
- In office 1884–1888
- Preceded by: B. F. Dillard
- Succeeded by: G. A. Burton

Louisiana State Senator from Union and Lincoln parishes
- In office 1888–1892
- Preceded by: G. L. Gaskins; Elisha T. Sellers
- Succeeded by: Hiram R. Lott; W. A. VanHook

Louisiana State Auditor
- In office 1892–1900

Personal details
- Born: April 28, 1853 Shiloh, Union Parish; Louisiana, USA
- Died: May 31, 1926 (aged 73) New Orleans, Louisiana
- Resting place: Metairie Cemetery in New Orleans
- Party: Democratic
- Spouse: Isabelle Manning Heard (m. 1878)
- Children: 5

William Wright (W. W.) Heard (April 28, 1853 - May 31, 1926) was the 32nd Governor of Louisiana from 1900 to 1904. His governorship saw the start of the Louisiana's oil and gas industry.

== Early life ==
Heard was born April 28, 1853, to Stephen S. Heard and Mary Ann Wright, in Union Parish, where he grew up on a farm. His older brothers served in the Confederate Army, while he attended local schools. He was a Baptist. He married Isabelle Manning on December 3, 1878, with whom he had five children.

== Public service ==
At age 23, in 1876, he was elected clerk of court of Union Parish. In 1884, Heard was elected to the Louisiana House of Representatives from Union Parish in north Louisiana, based about Farmerville. After a single four-year term, he was elected in 1888 to the Louisiana State Senate for a four-year term. In 1892, Heard was elected as Louisiana state auditor of public accounts, a position that he held for two terms of eight years.

As a protégé of the outgoing governor, Murphy James Foster, Sr., Heard was controversially hand-picked by Foster to succeed him at the Democratic state convention of 1900 at a time before Louisiana held primary elections. Heard was a member of the Democratic Party, but he had Populist tendencies and was a supporter of the expanded coinage of silver. The first Louisiana State Board of Education was established during his administration.

At the general election, he defeated two Republicans running on separate tickets, both of whom received less than 22 percent of the vote following the mass-scale disenfranchisement of African American voters via Jim Crow laws. Reflecting this was the dramatic decline in voting, from a post-Reconstruction high in the 1896 statewide election of over 203,000 votes down to only 76,000 by 1900.

Heard was inaugurated governor on May 8, 1900, and held this office until May 10, 1904. At the time governors in Louisiana could not succeed themselves. His term was fairly low-key compared to other colorful and dynamic personalities that held that office and he was considered to be a "bureaucratic" governor.

Heard carried on a correspondence with a young state representative, Harry D. Wilson of Tangipahoa Parish, who in 1916 was elected to the first of eight terms as the Louisiana Commissioner of Agriculture and Forestry. Wilson petitioned Heard to permit the establishment of the town of Independence, which had been settled by Wilson's father, a physician, in the 1850s. The town was reduced in area before it was established in 1912, by which time Heard had been out of office for eight years. Wilson himself was the father of Justin E. Wilson, the Louisiana Cajun humorist and chef.

It was during Heard's term that the discovery of oil was made by W. Scott Heywood and Associates of what is now Jeff Davis Parish, then part of Calcasieu Parish. This company completed Jennings Oil Company Number 1, Jules Clement, at Evangeline on September 21, 1901. This was the start of the vital Louisiana oil and gas industry.

The Louisiana Revised Statutes specify that the governor shall determine the design of the official state seal. To standardize a design for the seal, Governor Heard instructed the Secretary of State in 1902 to use a seal described as: "A Pelican, with its head turned to the left, in nest with three young; the Pelican, following the tradition in act of tearing its breast to feed its young; around the edge of the seal to be inscribed 'State of Louisiana'. Over head of the Pelican to be inscribed 'Union, Justice', and under the Pelican to be inscribed 'Confidence'." The description of the seal included the motto, which Gov. William Heard had chosen: Union, Justice, Confidence. This seal was adopted on April 30, 1902.

Heard achieved the formation of the state prison system, which eliminated privately contracted prisons. He was also instrumental in forming the State Department of Pest Control, thus trying to control the hated boll weevil, which plagued the cotton plants.

Serving in public office most of his early life, Heard became a banker and an accountant in New Orleans after his single term as governor. After leaving office, he was later moderator of the Concord Baptist State Convention and vice-president of the Southern Baptist Convention. He died in New Orleans on May 31, 1926. He is interred there at Metairie Cemetery.

Party political offices
Preceded by Murphy J. Foster	Democratic nominee for Governor of Louisiana; 1900	Succeeded by Newton C. Blanchard
Louisiana House of Representatives
Preceded by B. F. Dillard	Louisiana State Representative from Union Parish; William Wright Heard; 1884–1888	Succeeded by G. A. Burton
Louisiana State Senate
Preceded by G. L. Gaskins; Elisha T. Sellers	Louisiana State Senator from Union and Lincoln parishes William Wright Heard; 1888–1892	Succeeded by Hiram R. Lott; W. A. VanHook
Political offices
Preceded by Murphy J. Foster, Sr.	32nd Governor of Louisiana; William Wright Heard; 1900-1904	Succeeded by Newton C. Blanchard
