= Virginie Amélie Avegno Gautreau =

American socialite

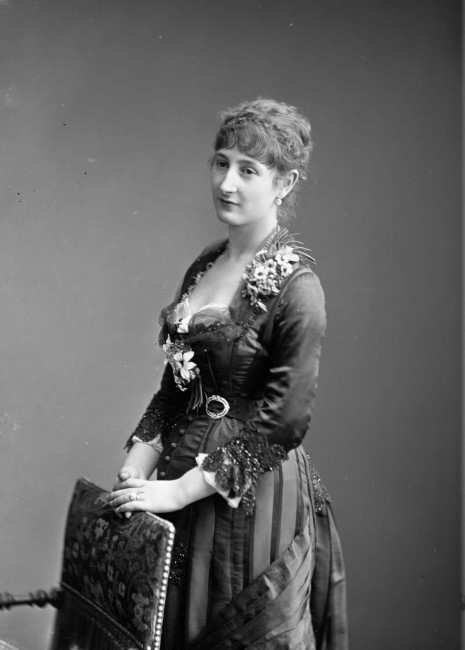
- Avegno, ca. 1878
- Born: Virginie Amélie Avegno; 29 January 1859; New Orleans, Louisiana, U.S.
- Died: 25 July 1915 (aged 56); Paris, France
- Known for: Subject of John Singer Sargent's painting Portrait of Madame X
- Spouse: Pierre Gautreau
- Children: Louise Gautreau

Virginie Amélie Avegno Gautreau (née Avegno; 29 January 1859 – 25 July 1915) was an American-born Parisian socialite, who gained notoriety as the subject of John Singer Sargent's Portrait of Madame X.

== Early life and education ==
Gautreau was born Virginie Amélie Avegno of French Creole ancestry, in New Orleans, Louisiana, on 29 January 1859. Her parents were Anatole Placide Avegno, who was French Creole, and Marie Virginie de Ternant, who was French. Virginie had a younger sister, Valentine Marie, who was born in 1861 and died on March 11, 1866 from yellow fever. Her father also died during the American Civil War in 1862. Her sister and father were both buried in the Saint Louis Cemetery. Gautreau was named after her grandmother Virginie de Ternant, but throughout her life she went by her middle name Amélie. In 1867, when Virginie was eight years old, she moved with her widowed mother back to France. Her education was funded by her uncle and she attended a convent school. When she was introduced to Parisian high society, she was praised for her beauty.

== Marriage and family ==
She married Pierre Gautreau, a French banker and shipping magnate, on August 1, 1878 (their marriage contract had been signed on June 18, 1878). Pierre Gautreau was born in Saint-Malo France and grew up in Paramé. He served as a captain in the French military and was inducted into the Legion of Honour. Virginie Avegno was 19 when she married Pierre Gautreau, who was 40 years old. The couple lived in Paris on the Rue Jouffroy. They had a daughter, Louise (1879–1911), who was named after Pierre Gautreau's late mother. After Louise's marriage to the lawyer Oliver Jallu in 1901, Virginie and Pierre lived separately, with Pierre living at Rue Jouffroy and Virginie living on the Rue de la Tour.

== Professional beauty ==
Virginie Gautreau became one of Parisian society's most celebrated beauties; she was often referred to as “la belle Mme Gautreau” in the press. Gautreau's makeup and fashion made her stand out. She emphasized her pale skin by using a lavender-colored powder, she would also apply blush to her ears, and color in her eyebrows. Her hair would be dyed with henna. The lavender powder used by Gautreau was toxic as it contained potassium chlorate and the blush she used also contained lead. Gautreau chose streamlined dresses that enhanced her hourglass figure. Newspapers at the time like L'Événement and Le Figaro often commented on her fashion choices.

== Madame X ==
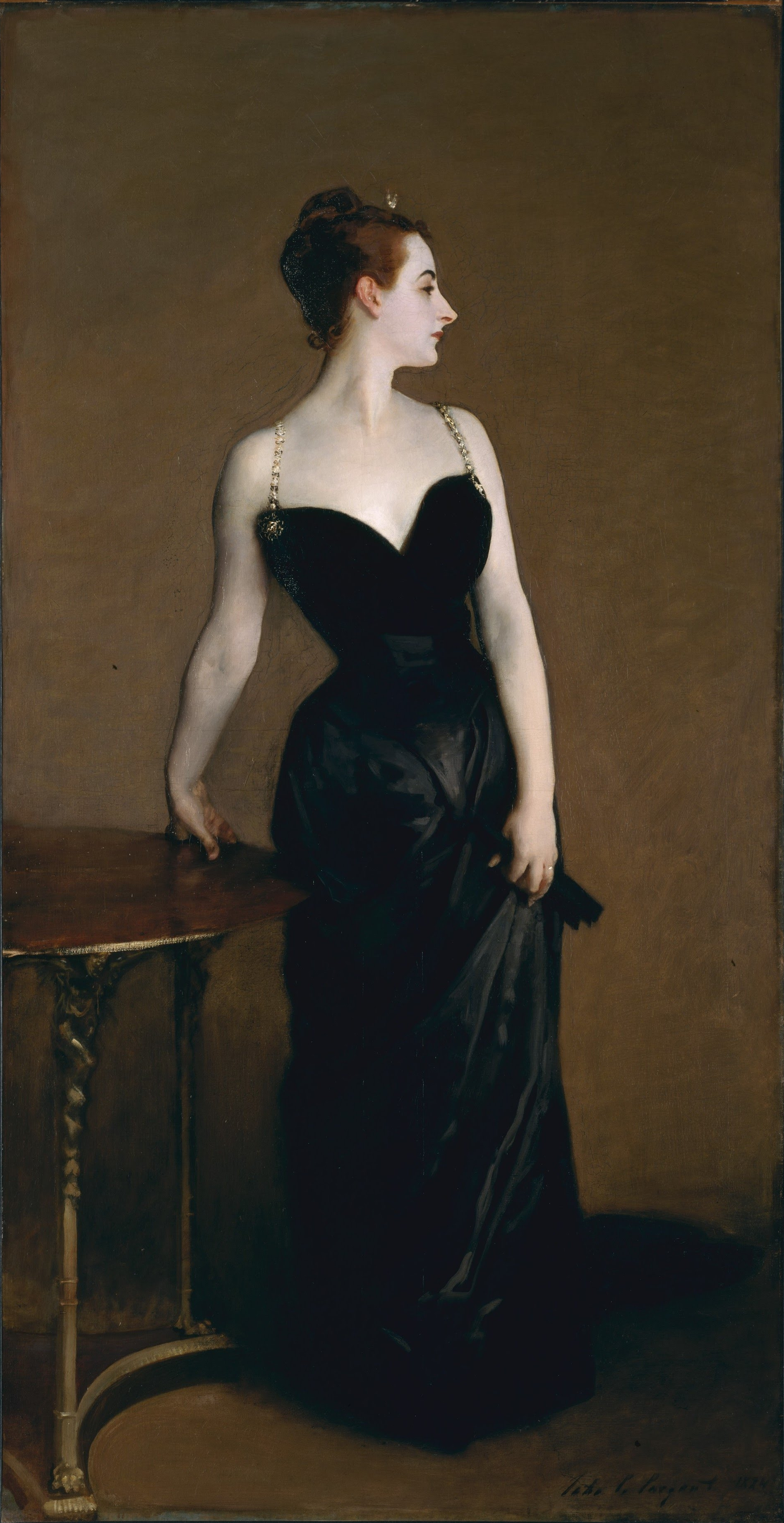
John Singer Sargent, Portrait of Madame X (Madame Pierre Gautreau), 1884, oil on canvas, 234.95 x 109.86 cm, Metropolitan Museum of Art

Gautreau is best known today as the model for John Singer Sargent's 1884 Portrait of Madame X that he exhibited at the Paris Salon.

Gautreau's beauty and elaborate use of makeup caught Sargent's eye and prompted him to want to paint Gautreau—the portrait was not commissioned. Gautreau's cousin Ben Castillo connected them and Sargent started work on the portrait in Brittany at Gautreau's summer home. Gautreau's mother supported the painting, believing that the portrait would raise the standing of her daughter. Gautreau herself was initially pleased with it; a contemporary note by Gautreau called the portrait a masterpiece.

When the painting was exhibited at the 1884 salon, the public was offended by it. While today both straps appear securely on her shoulders, originally Sargent painted her right strap as having fallen off her shoulder. The deliberate suggestiveness was regarded as scandalous. Her lack of jewelry and gloves made her appear especially bare. One French critic wrote that if one stood before the portrait during its exhibition in the Salon, one "would hear every curse word in the French language." Sargent and Gautreau were seen as having openly defied convention in the choice of pose and elaborate makeup. La Vie Parisienne published a caricature of Madame X, taking the implied fallen strap to its logical conclusion and revealing her breast.

While Gautreau's pale and powdered skin was received well in real life, critics believed the depiction of her skin within the painting made her appear sickly. The critic Ralph Curtis wrote he “was disappointed by the color, she looks decomposed. All the women jeer 'Ah Voila "la belle": Oh quel horror.'" Gautreau's mother implored Sargent to remove the portrait from the Salon, but he did not. Sargent soon decamped for London, taking the portrait of Gautreau with him as she had rejected it.

Accounts that Gautreau retreated from society after the scandal are sensationalized, however; in actuality she became more "selective about her activities, limiting her exposure to only the most important events."

Gautreau later posed for several other painters, including Gustave Courtois (1891) and Antonio de La Gándara (1898). Gautreau commissioned both paintings. In tonality of colors, privacy of her face, and style of her dress, La Gándara's was more conservative than Sargent's painting.

== Death ==
Gautreau died in Paris on 25 July 1915. She was buried in the Gautreau family crypt at their Château des Chênes in Saint-Malo, Brittany. Her will included two men, Victor-Amédée Callaux and Henri Favalelli, which came as a surprise because they were not known by her family.

== Representation in other media ==
- Gautreau's and Sargent's intertwined stories are the subject of Strapless (2004) by Deborah Davis. ISBN 978-1585423361
- Gautreau is also the subject of I Am Madame X: A Novel (2004) by Gioia Diliberto. ISBN 978-0743456807
