= Marko Jelisejić =

Serbian playwright and translator

Marko Jelisejić (Serbian Cyrillic: Марко Јелисејић); (1760 – after 1826) was a Serbian writer, translator, dramatist, pedagogue, and actor. Jelisejić was born in Futog, then part of the Habsburg Monarchy, and died in Veliki Bečkerek, Habsburg Monarchy, now known as Zrenjanin.

== Career ==
Marko Jelisejić was a high school teacher in Veliki Bečkerek, who had a permanent amateur theatre company in the cosmopolitan city of Bečkerek as early as 1783 From that time, and through the turn into the 19th century, he and his students organised stage performances, such as dramatised Biedermeier period novels and staged theatrical performances for the public in Banat and other parts of Vojvodina. Jelisejić translated theatrical works of historical and sentimental content of his choice from German, Hungarian, and Romanian languages and rehearsed them for public performance with his students. He is best remembered as one of the initiators of theatrical life in Vojvodina and one who introduced sentimentalism into prose and dramatic literature. Furthermore, Jelisejić was known for bringing his imprint and vision of theatre into his plays.

Jelisejić was the founder of a theater company in Veliki Bečkerek with his students in 1783. With the help of Arkadije Pejić, a merchant based in Timișoara, Jelisejić went on to print two translated plays: Bélizaire (1832) and Alexander and Natalia or Peter the Great, Tsar of Russia (1838). In 1863, Arkadije Pejić informed Jovan Đorđević, then the director of the Serbian National Theatre in Novi Sad, that he was also a member of the Jelisejić Theatre. In time, Jelisejić would become the founder of a new Serbian theater, and Arkadije Pejić would be Jelisejić's most promising dramatic actor, the first recognised Serbian actor of modern times. It is recorded that the theater presented the play "The Beautiful Joseph", possibly a work that Jelisejić translated. Pejić left the stage in 1800 and went on to become a successful merchant. Pejić continued to support Jelisejić's theatre company financially throughout his life.

== Legacy ==
Serbian modern dramatic art grew from students' amateur performances given in summer in the Austro-Hungarian territories in the late 17th and 18th centuries. From these came the travelling companies; only later did permanent companies appear with permanent centres. Most of the plays given at this time were German, though the first Serbian work to be performed in Sremski Karlovci was Emanuel Kozačinski's "The Death of Tsar Uroš" in June 1734.

The city of Bečkerek has its own theater story – long, rich, and filled with grand performances of the past. Theater life existed here before the theater building was built, in the times when traveling troupes from Europe and the first Serbian theater impresario, pedagogue Marko Jelisejić, brought performances to the city at the end of the 18th century.

Today in Serbia, Marko Jelisejić is recognized as both the founder and pioneer of the first modern Serbian amateur theatre. The father of the Serbian theatre is claimed by Joakim Vujić, an actor and dramatist, who in 1835 was the director of the Princely Serbian Theatre at Kragujevac (at the time, Kragujevac was the capital of the Principality of Serbia).

== Works ==
The plays translated from foreign languages into Serbian by Marko Jelisejić were contemporary even though their threads originate from Classical literature. For example: "Atonement or the newly elected king", derives from one of the plays of Sophocles, and the "Virgin of Marienburg," is a Medieval German monastic drama.

- "Bélisaire", Marko Jelisejić translated Marmontel's Bélisaire from French into Serbian
- "Alexander and Natalia or Peter the Great Tsar of Russia", translated from German to Serbian by Marko Jeleseijic
- "Djevica od Marijenburga" (Virgin of Marienburg)
- "Okajanje ili novo izabrani kralj" (Atonement or the newly elected king)

== See also ==
- Emanuel Kozačinski
- Joakim Vujić
- Jovan Rajić
- Antonije Hadžić
- August von Kotzebue
