= Bélizaire =

Bélizaire (French pronunciation: [belizɛʁ]) is a French and West Indian (Haitian) surname and a Haitian and Louisiana Creole masculine given name. A French form of the name is Bélisaire. Belisario and Bellisario are Italian and Spanish forms of the name. All forms of the name are derived from Belisarius (notably borne by the 6th century Byzantine commander). The surname is very rare in France. As of 2010, there were 1,824 people with the surname Belizaire in the United States, having been brought to the country from the West Indies, primarily Haiti.

Notable people with the surname include:

- Déjean Bélizaire (1935–2025), Haitian politician
- Fritz Bélizaire, Haitian politician and civil engineer
- Néfertari Bélizaire (1962–2017), Haitian-born Canadian actor
- Thony Belizaire (1955–2013), Haitian photographer and photojournalist

== Art ==
- Bélizaire and the Frey Children, 1837 group portrait painting
- Belizaire the Cajun, 1986 American film

== See also ==
- Bélisaire, 1767 French novel
- Belisario (surname), an Italian and Spanish surname
- Bellisario, an Italian surname
