= Margaret Haughery =

American philanthropist

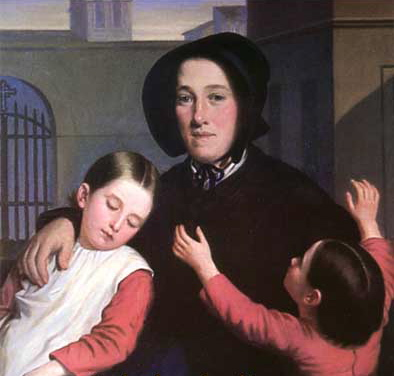
Portrait of Margaret Haughery, c. 1842, by Jacques Amans.

Margaret Haughery (1813–1882) was a philanthropist known as "the mother of the orphans". Margaret Gaffney Haughery (pronounced as HAWK -r- ee) was a beloved historical figure in New Orleans, Louisiana, in the 1880s. Widely known as "Our Margaret," “The Bread Woman of New Orleans" and "Mother of Orphans," Margaret devoted her life's work to the care and feeding of the poor and hungry, and to fund and build orphanages throughout the city.

An Irish immigrant widow woman of many titles, Margaret was also commonly referred to as the "Angel of the Delta," “Mother Margaret," “Margaret of New Orleans," the "Celebrated Margaret", "Head Mame", and "Margaret of Tully." A Catholic, she worked closely with New Orleans Sisters of Charity, associated with the Roman Catholic Archdiocese of New Orleans.

She opened up four orphanages in the New Orleans area in the 19th century. Many years later in the 20th and 21st centuries, several of the asylums Margaret founded as places of shelter for orphans and widows evolved into homes for the elderly.

A woman of great charity, Margaret became famed for her lifelong championing of the destitute. Some people considered her a living saint worthy of canonisation. Born into poverty and orphaned at a young age, she began her adult life as a washwoman and a peddler – yet she died a businesswoman and philanthropist and received a state funeral.

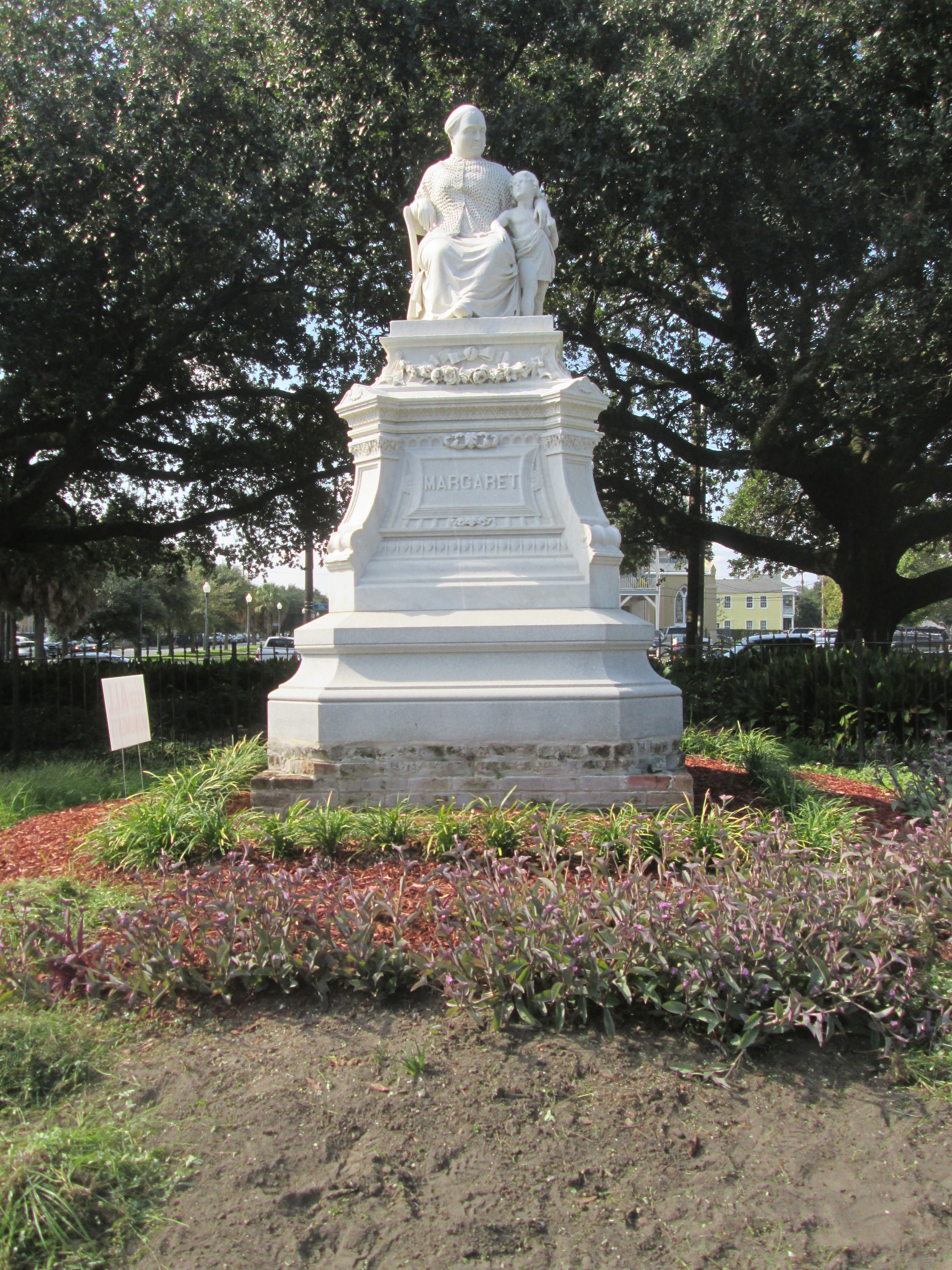
Statue commemorating "Margaret" in the Lower Garden District of New Orleans

== Early life ==
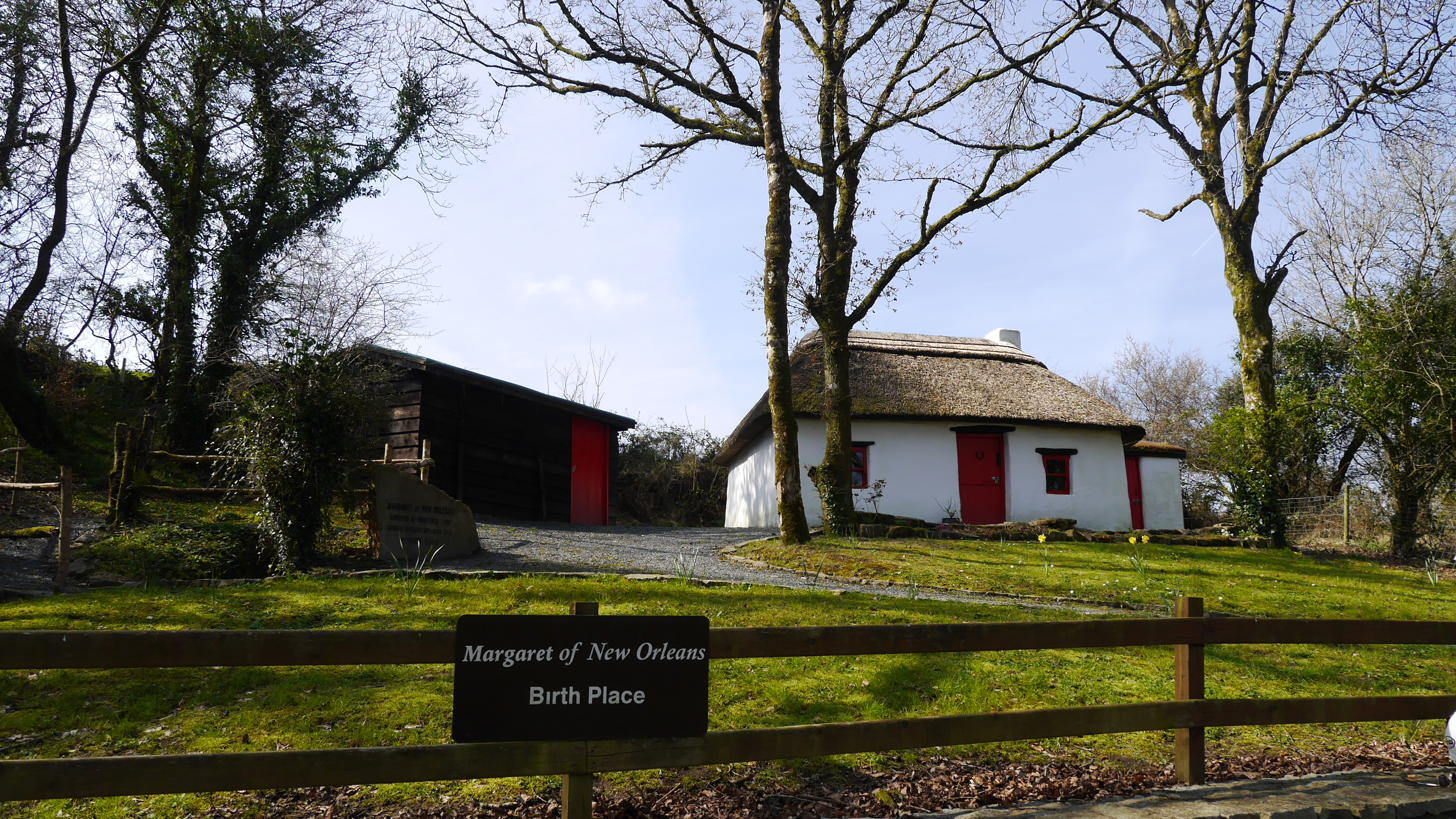
A replica of the cottage in which Margaret Haughery (née Gaffney) was born

Margaret was born in a stone cottage in Ireland in 1813, the fifth child of William and Margaret O'Rourke Gaffney. Margaret's parents were from Tully South, in the parish of Carrigallen, County Leitrim. Her father had a small farm and was possibly a tailor.

in Ireland, 1816 was called "the year without a summer" and 1817 "the year of the malty flour". The year 1818 was one of high emigration due to a succession of wet summers followed by extreme winters. William, his wife Margaret, and three of their six children – including Margaret (then five), older brother Kevin and baby sister Kathleen – left Ireland for the United States. The three eldest children were to remain temporarily with their uncle Matthew O'Rourke in Ireland, until such time as they could be sent for. The final parting was so distressing that friends drew the children staying in Ireland aside, and before the divided family left Ireland they knelt to receive the curate's blessing.

== Emigration to America ==
The high seas journey by steamer took six months to reach America, as severe storms affected the ship's progress. Ship records reflect that the passengers despaired of ever reaching dry land again. At-sea provisions became so scarce that one passenger recalled that each person was allowed just one cracker a day. Almost all luggage was destroyed including the Gaffneys' trunk, whose lid Margaret's father then used to rock his young children. Eventually the ship reached Chesapeake Bay, then finally Baltimore. During the long voyage, a Welsh woman with the surname Richards became acquainted with the Gaffney family.

Shortly after the Gaffney family disembarked in Baltimore, Maryland, baby Kathleen died. Like all small tenant farmers of his era, Margaret's father William was ill-equipped for city life. His job opportunities were limited. Nevertheless, he secured employment as a carter at the Baltimore docks and soon sent money to his brother-in-law O'Rourke for the upkeep of his three children remaining in Ireland. He had almost saved enough to send for them when in 1822 a yellow fever epidemic ravaged Baltimore, claiming Margaret's parents, William and Margaret, who died within days of each other. They are buried in St. Patrick's cemetery in Baltimore. All household effects were burned, as was the custom, to prevent spread of the infection, with the exception of a prayer book, which was found twenty-seven years later and returned to the family.

Margaret, now nine, was homeless and soon alone as her older brother Kevin disappeared and was never heard from again. It is thought he may have gone out west. Mrs. Richards, who had made the overseas crossing with the Gaffney family heard of Margaret's plight. She had lost her husband to yellow fever. She took Margaret into her home. There Margaret remained for some years, where she worked for her keep. In fact she may have been little more than a servant. Margaret received no formal education, and never learned to read or write. When old enough, Margaret went into domestic service, which was common for Irishwomen in Baltimore at that time.

== Marriage and move to New Orleans ==
On 10 October 1835, at the age of 21, Margaret married Irish-born Charles Haughery in a ceremony at Baltimore Cathedral. Citing concerns about his health, Margaret argued that relocating to a warmer climate might be beneficial. The couple departed Baltimore aboard the ship Hyperion and arrived in New Orleans on 20 November 1835. Like many residents of the city at that time, they were exposed to recurring epidemics of yellow fever and cholera. Charles's health showed some temporary improvement, but this was not sustained, and medical practitioners advised that he undertake a sea voyage.

Charles resolved to return to Ireland, his country of birth. The journey was postponed for several months due to the birth of the couple's first child, a daughter named Frances. Charles eventually departed, but after some months Margaret was informed that he had died shortly after arriving. Within a few months, the infant Frances fell seriously ill and died. By the age of 23, Margaret had lost both her husband and child. Reflecting on this period, she later stated, "My God! Thou hast broken every tie: Thou hast stripped me of all. Again I am all alone.”

At the time, New Orleans was administratively divided into three municipalities. The first comprised the French Quarter and Faubourg Tremé. The second consisted of Uptown, then defined as all settled areas upriver from Canal Street. The third encompassed Downtown, covering the remainder of the city from Esplanade Avenue downriver.

Following these events, Margaret became involved in charitable work, focusing in particular on the needs of widows and orphans. The Sisters of Charity, under the direction of Sister Regis Barrett, operated the Poydras Orphan Asylum, which had been established by Julien de Lallande Poydras. Margaret donated surplus income from her employment at the laundry of the St Charles Hotel to support the orphanage. She later left her position at the hotel and took up work with the Sisters of Charity as manager of the orphan asylum. When food supplies were insufficient, she purchased provisions using her own earnings. The Female Orphan Asylum operated by the Sisters of Charity, constructed in 1840, was financed through funds generated by Margaret's work.

== Businesswoman ==
During the yellow fever epidemic in New Orleans in the 1850s, Margaret visited households across the city to provide care to those affected, without distinction of race or religion. She also offered reassurance to dying mothers by undertaking responsibility for the care of their children. In this period, she assisted in the establishment of St. Theresa's Orphan Asylum on Camp Street. St. Theresa's Church was likewise constructed largely through her efforts, in cooperation with Sister Regis.

Using savings from her wages, Margaret purchased two cows to provide milk for orphaned children. She later acquired a small milk cart and sold surplus milk in the Vieux Carré (French Quarter). This activity developed into a dairy operation with nineteen cows, which proved commercially successful and was subsequently expanded. Margaret increased production to include cream and butter, and within two years the herd had grown to forty cows. The dairy became a profitable enterprise, and she was widely recognised as a businesswoman who sold her goods directly within the community. She also financially supported the St Vincent de Paul Infant Asylum at Race and Magazine Streets, which opened in 1862.

While continuing to provide assistance to orphans and the poor, Margaret's financial resources increased. At one stage, she took employment in a bakery to supplement her income. She later loaned money to a baker but discovered that the business operated by Monsieur d' Aquin was close to insolvency. As she had become the principal shareholder, Margaret concluded that assuming control of the bakery was the only means of recovering her investment and proceeded to manage the business herself.

Operating as Margaret's Bakery, the enterprise expanded rapidly and became the primary source of her wealth. She continued to distribute bread personally using a handcart, which replaced her earlier milk cart. The bakery supplied both the local market and export customers. All orphan asylums in New Orleans received bread from her bakery at a nominal cost. Continuous improvements were made to the operation, and it became the first steam-powered bakery in the southern United States, employing a substantial workforce. Located on New Levée Street, the bakery remained profitable throughout the Civil War, despite widespread destruction elsewhere in the region.

As her bakery prospered, Margaret's business became well known. Operating under the name Margaret Haughery & Company, it marketed "Margaret's Bread", and she became popularly known as the "Bread Woman of New Orleans". She later owned a retail establishment known as the Klotz Cracker Factory, associated with the Klotz Bakery.

The poor and homeless frequently gathered on Levée Street, where the bakery was located. Margaret routinely provided them with bread, distributing loaves cut in half to prevent resale for the purchase of alcohol.

== Civil War ==
The American Civil War had significant social and economic effects on New Orleans, contributing to an increase in the number of orphans and residents requiring assistance. Margaret undertook measures to alleviate hardship by supplying food to those affected by wartime shortages. She distributed wagonloads of bread and flour from her bakery to residents of the city during the period of occupation.

In 1862, following the occupation of New Orleans by the Union Army and the imposition of martial law, the commanding officer, Benjamin Franklin Butler, established military barriers and curfews restricting civilian movement. Despite these restrictions, Margaret continued to deliver food and milk to individuals living beyond the established lines. General Butler warned her that further violations could result in severe punishment. She asked whether it was the intention of President Abraham Lincoln to allow the poor to starve. Butler replied, "You are not to go through the picket lines without my permission; is that clear?" Margaret answered, "Quite clear." Butler then stated, "You have my permission."

During the Reconstruction period, Margaret supported Union efforts to maintain order in Louisiana. This support is evidenced by a ceremonial sword she donated to US General C. Colon Augur, which is held in the collection of the Louisiana State Museum.

== Life in New Orleans ==
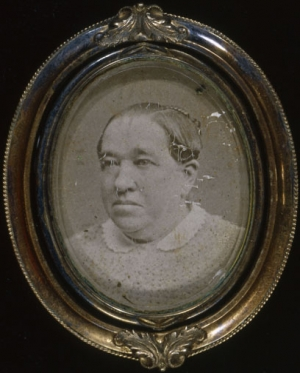
Photoportrait in her latter years

After the Civil War, during the Reconstruction Period, Margaret accumulated sufficient resources to construct a large steam-powered bakery. By this stage, she was widely known in New Orleans. Residents from across social classes sought her advice, and she was frequently consulted by business owners as well as individuals experiencing poverty. She often sat at the open doorway of her office, engaging with visitors regardless of their social standing.

Operating from the bakery in the centre of the city, she became a well-known public figure. In addition to providing assistance to those in need, she was consulted by people of varied backgrounds regarding business matters, and her judgement was widely respected. She was commonly referred to as "Our Margaret" by residents of New Orleans. Contemporary accounts described her as possessing considerable energy and resolve, combined with a courteous and restrained manner.

Margaret arrived in Antebellum New Orleans during a period of commercial expansion associated with the cotton trade. Like many Irish immigrants, she sought employment and opportunity in Louisiana. Irish immigrant men often moved away from dock work into labour-intensive occupations such as canal digging, levee construction, and railroad building, tasks considered too costly to assign to enslaved labourers. During the construction of the New Basin Canal, Irish workers undertook hazardous labour for wages of approximately one dollar per day. Although no official records were maintained, estimates suggest that approximately 20,000 workers died during the project, leaving many widows and orphans. Irish communities, frequently living in impoverished conditions, were especially vulnerable to recurrent epidemics. The Great Famine led to increased Irish migration, with New Orleans offering relatively inexpensive passage. Irish immigrants were also drawn to the city's established Catholic institutions, dating from French and Spanish rule prior to the Louisiana Purchase. By 1860, individuals of Irish origin accounted for approximately 14% of the city's population, making it the third-largest Irish community in the United States. Irish women formed a distinctive immigrant group, often travelling and residing together, which differed from prevailing social norms for women in the American South.

Throughout Margaret's lifetime in New Orleans, yellow fever epidemics transmitted by mosquitoes posed an ongoing threat. Between 1853 and 1855 alone, approximately 13,000 deaths were attributed to the disease. She also survived the 1856 Last Island Hurricane and the 1849 breach of the Mississippi River levee upriver from the city, the most severe flooding experienced by New Orleans at that time. The resulting Sauvé's Crevasse flood displaced an estimated 12,000 residents.

== Orphanages built ==
Among the orphanages in New Orleans associated with Margaret, often referred to as the "Mother of Orphans", were St. Elizabeth Orphan Asylum on Napoleon Avenue, the Louise Home for girls on Clio Street, the St. Vincent Infant Asylum at Race and Magazine Streets, and an asylum and church on Erato Street that later became St. Theresa of Avila Church. She also contributed financially to the Protestant Episcopal Home and to Jewish charitable organisations in New Orleans. In her will, she made bequests to the Seventh Street Protestant Orphan Asylum, the German Protestant Orphan Asylum, the German Orphan Catholic Asylum, the Widows and Orphans of Jews Asylum, the Daughters of Charity of St. Vincent de Paul, and other institutions.

The Sisters of Charity withdrew from Poydras Street at the end of 1836 and relocated to a building on New Levée Street. The structure, which had been vacant for several years and was in poor condition, was widely regarded as uninhabitable. Contemporary records identify this institution as the first Catholic orphan asylum in New Orleans. Margaret initially intended only to assist the sisters in establishing the facility, but she subsequently assumed a central role in its operation. Demonstrating organisational and financial skills, she was appointed manager of the asylum. The building was rendered serviceable, and its condition improved to such an extent that the landlord decided to sell the property, necessitating another relocation within two years.

Margaret later identified a house on an abandoned plantation nearby and persuaded the owner to allow its use rent-free. This arrangement enabled the relocation of the children from the city to a rural environment in Louisiana. The children received basic education, including reading and writing, as well as practical instruction such as sewing, intended to prepare them for adult life.

Seeking a permanent facility for orphan care, Margaret initiated construction of St. Theresa's Asylum on Camp Street in 1840. The site was donated by F. Saulet. Funding for the project came largely from Margaret's own resources, supplemented by contributions she solicited from others. Despite this support, it took ten years to eliminate the associated debt. During this period, she continued to support the orphanage operating on the plantation.

In the mid-19th century, yellow fever again spread widely in New Orleans. The epidemic of 1853 resulted in large numbers of children being left without parents. Margaret visited households affected by illness across religious, racial, and ethnic lines, including Protestants, Catholics, Jews, Black and white residents, the Louisiana Creole people, native-born New Orleanians, and immigrants. The scale of need led her to undertake what she described as a "baby house" project. Profits from her businesses were directed towards this initiative, which culminated in the establishment of the St. Vincent Infant Asylum at Race and Magazine Streets, opened in 1862. The debt incurred by the project took sixteen years to repay and was largely borne by Margaret.

Additional institutions founded during the 1850s and 1860s included the Louise Home for working girls at 1404 Clio Street and the St. Elizabeth House of Industry at 1314 Napoleon Street. During successive yellow fever epidemics, Margaret continued to visit the homes of the sick and dying, providing assistance without regard to race, creed, or religion, and offering assurances that their children would be cared for.

Estimates suggest that the total value of Margaret's charitable contributions amounted to approximately $600,000.

== Dress ==
Despite her financial success, Margaret spent little on personal attire. Contemporary accounts state that she owned no more than two dresses: a plain dress for everyday wear and a simple silk dress with a mantle for formal occasions. She consistently wore a Quaker bonnet, which became something of a trademark.

== Illness and death ==
At the age of 69, Margaret developed an incurable illness, the specific nature of which was not recorded. She remained ill for several months under the care of the Sisters of Charity. During this period, she received visits from individuals of varied social backgrounds and religious affiliations. Pope Pius IX sent his blessing and a crucifix, which was delivered by Hubert Thirion, a young French priest serving in Louisiana.

Margaret died on 9 February 1882. Her body was taken to the St. Vincent Infant Asylum, where it was embalmed and lay in state. The funeral was held on the following Saturday morning. Contemporary newspapers reported her death prominently, with black borders used to mark the occasion. Her obituary appeared on the front page of The Times-Picayune, the principal newspaper of New Orleans.

== State funeral ==
The funeral cortege assembled at the asylum and included thirteen priests, led by Archbishop Napoléon-Joseph Perché, the third Archbishop of New Orleans. New Orleans Mayor Benjamin Flanders headed the procession, and two Lieutenant Governors of Louisiana, George L. Walton and W.A. Robertson, served as pallbearers. The funeral was attended by several thousand people, including political leaders, business figures, and members of the clergy.

Orphans from all of the city's asylums were present, both Black and white, along with members of the historic Mississippi fire brigade, of which Margaret was an honorary member, and nuns from multiple religious orders. Friends and supporters also attended. Large crowds lined the streets, sidewalks, balconies, and windows along the route. Among those present were three generals, clergy representing multiple denominations, and civic officials. When the procession passed the New Orleans Stock Exchange at noon, business was suspended, and members came outside to observe. At St. Patrick's Church (New Orleans, Louisiana), the congregation was so large that pallbearers experienced difficulty carrying the coffin through the central aisle.

A Requiem Mass was celebrated by Francis Avery Allen, with Archbishop Perché reading the prayers following the Mass. The sermon was delivered by Thirion. Margaret was buried in Saint Louis Cemetery No. 2, in the same tomb as Sister Francis Regis, a member of the Sisters of Charity who died in 1862 and with whom Margaret had worked closely in her early charitable efforts.

Margaret’s will was submitted for probate the following Monday. In it, she bequeathed her estate to charitable causes serving widows, orphans, and elderly people, without distinction of religion. The only exception was her bakery, which she left to her foster son, Bernard Klotz.

Following her death and the reading of the will, it was revealed that despite her extensive charitable giving, Margaret had retained substantial financial resources. These funds were distributed among the city's orphan asylums. Allocations were made without regard to race or religious affiliation. Margaret was quoted as saying, "They are all orphans alike." Her will was signed with a cross, as she never learned to read or write.

== Margaret Statue ==
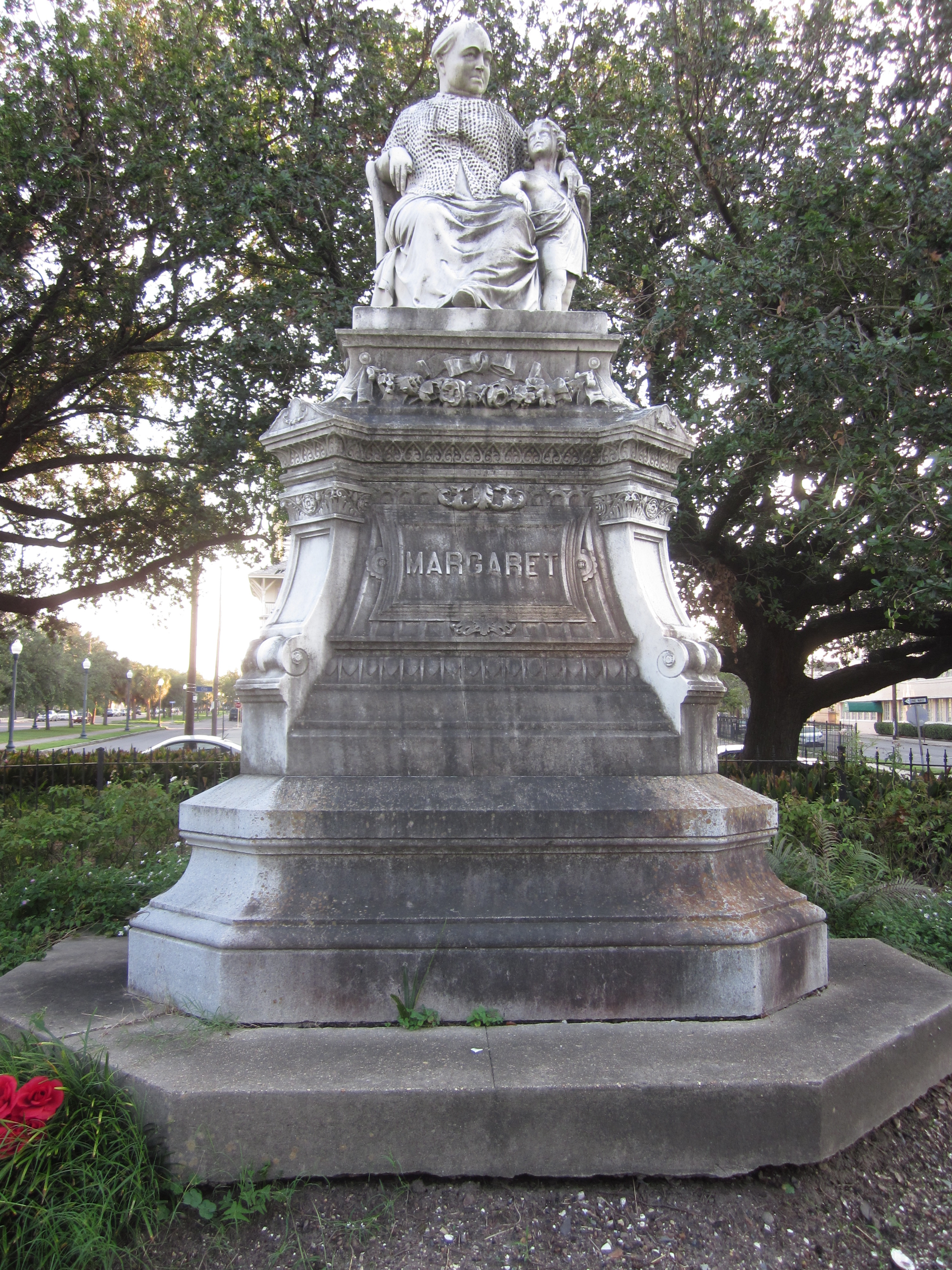
"Margaret" Statue, New Orleans

Public sentiment following Margaret's death led to calls for a permanent memorial in her honour. Contemporary accounts recorded the view that she had played a maternal role for many in the city, and that her contributions merited public commemoration. As a result, plans were initiated to erect a statue.

A committee was formed to oversee the project, and a site was acquired between Camp, Prytania, and Clio Streets. Sculptor Alexander Doyle was commissioned to produce the monument. Using photographs as references, the statue was first modelled in clay and then sent to Italy to be carved in Carrara marble. The initial version was returned to New York but was rejected by the commission due to flaws in the marble. A replacement block was secured, and Doyle assured the committee that a revised statue matching the approved model would be delivered to New Orleans by May 1884.

The monument was unveiled on 9 July 1884, two years after Margaret’s death, by children representing every orphanage in the city. Former Governor Francis T. Nicholls delivered an address at the ceremony. Also in attendance were the female commissioners, members of the executive committee, New Orleans Mayor J. Valsin Guillotte, members of the city council, and other officials. The cost of the statue was $6,000, raised through small donations, as "No large sums would be accepted". The monument bears only a single inscription: her name, Margaret. The figure was designed to reflect her appearance as she was known locally, seated at the doorway of her office or driving her small cart.

Doyle later produced other prominent monuments in New Orleans.

The park in which the statue stands is officially named Margaret Place. It has frequently been described as the first public monument erected to a woman in the United States. The sculpture depicts a seated woman in contemporary dress, with a child leaning against her. She is shown wearing practical shoes, a simple gingham dress, a shawl, and a bonnet. The plaque on the statue bears the single word "Margaret."

The site is located at the intersection of Camp and Prytania Streets in New Orleans. At the time of its unveiling, the statue was widely regarded as the first monument in the United States dedicated to a woman. One New Orleans newspaper editorial stated, "She was the most deservedly eminent, the most justly famous, of all the women of New Orleans, of our generation or of any other, in the whole history of the city".

Subsequent historical assessments have clarified that while a monument to Hannah Dustin erected in 1879 in New Hampshire predates Margaret’s statue, that monument was privately commissioned and located on private property. Margaret's statue is therefore recognised as the first publicly erected statue of a woman in the United States, the first monument dedicated to an American female philanthropist, and the only known public statue honouring a baker.

== Renewed interest in Margaret ==
An Ireland-based group called the "Margaret of New Orleans Tully Committee" has reconstructed Margaret's Irish birthplace cottage, using original stone. The group is dedicated to raising awareness about Margaret and her life's work.

A full-length documentary film about Irish-born American heroine, Margaret, is currently in production, Who is Margaret Haughery? And why don't you know who she is? It will contain interviews with historians, including the author of the 1996 biography: Margaret: Friend of Orphans, Mary Lou Widmer. The documentary is introduced by former United States Ambassador to the Vatican, Corinne Claiborne Lindy Boggs.

In 2009 the Leitrim Youth Theatre Company, Carrigallen, Ireland, mounted the first known live-theatre production of Margaret's life story. The stage performance "Our Story of Margaret of New Orleans" featured original music and songs.

The Ogden Museum of Southern Art obtained a Jacques Amans original portrait of Margaret.

== Other ==
Of the three older Gaffney family children left behind in Ireland (Thomas, Mary and Annie) when young Margaret and her parents, along with an infant and one brother, in 1819 set sail for America; for the rest of Margaret's life of tragedy and triumph – of service and charity to others, orphans and windows in particular – she only reunited with her remaining foreign-soil siblings once, when elder brother Thomas visited her in New Orleans in 1857.

Although first entombed at St. Louis Cemetery No. 2 with Sister Regis, the Sisters of Charity communal tomb was later moved to a circa 1971 mausoleum vault at St. Louis Cemetery No. 3, located on Esplanade Avenue in New Orleans. Margaret along with her dear friend Sister Regis, and each Sister of Charity who died prior to 1914, are listed on two plaques; Margaret's St. Louis Mausoleum final resting place is an unmarked Vault numbered 18A, located on Mary Magdalene Corridor.

New Orleans, Louisiana Archbishop Perché in his 1882 eulogy to Margaret said, "I have already been asked whether Margaret Haughery, who lived and labored so long and well amongst us, was a saint. It is not for me to make a pronouncement. But, if you put this same question to yourselves, dear brethren, you may find an answer similar to that which a little boy once made when a sister in our Sunday school enquired that somebody define a saint. 'I think' said the child, remembering the human figures in stained glass windows, 'that a saint is one who lets the light shine through.'”

== Sources ==
- LSU, Louisiana Leaders, Notable Women in History, Margaret Haughery
- Civil War Woman: Margaret Haughery
- Strousse, Flora. Margaret Haughery: bread woman of New Orleans. P.J. Kenedy 1st ed 1961
- New Orleans Past, Art in New Orleans, Margaret Haughery
- Old New Orleans Journal, Margaret Haughery
- Gehman, Mary and Ries, Nancy. Women and New Orleans A History. New Orleans, LA: Margaret Media, Inc. 1996
- Famous Americans, Margaret Haughery
- Carrington Bouve, Pauline. American Heroes and Heroines. Kessinger Publishing 2006
- Jumonville, Florence M. Louisiana History: An Annotated Bibliography (Bibliographies of the States of the United States). Greenwood Press 2002
- The Anglo-Celt, 2009
- Carrigallen.com
- Margaret of New Orleans Tully Committee
- Roots Web, Irish-American-L Archives, Margaret Haughery
- Widmer, Mary Lou. Lace Curtain. Ace Books 1985
- Yellow Fever Deaths in New Orleans, 1817–1905
- Neihaus, Earl F. The Irish in New Orleans, 1800–1860 (The Irish Americans). Arno Press 1976
- Gaust, Edwin S. and Noll, Mark A. Documentary History of Religion in America since 1877. Wm. B. Eerdmans Publishing Company, 3rd ed. 2003
- A. C. G. Margaret Haughery. Demorest 1885
- Louisiana State Museum
- Genealogy Bank Historical Newspapers of the 1800s until present day.
- angelofthedelta.com

== Bibliography ==
- Saxon, Lyle "Gumbo Ya Ya: Folk Tales of Louisiana" Pelican Publishing Company 1987
- Leavitt, Mel "Great Characters of New Orleans" Lexikos 1984.
- Martinez, Raymond J. "The Immortal Margaret Haughery" Industries Publishing Agency 1956. Hope Publications; revised edition 1967.
- Stuart, Bonnye E. "More than petticoats. Remarkable Louisiana women" Globe Pequot 2009.
- Widmer, Mary Lou, "Margaret, Friend of Orphans" Pelican Publishing Company 1996.
- Clark, Margaret Varnell "The Louisiana Irish" iUniverse, Inc. 2007.
