= Belisario (given name) =

Belisario is an Italian and Spanish masculine given name. Notable people with the given name include:

- Belisario Acquaviva (c. 1464–1528), Italian nobleman and writer
- Belisario Agulla (born 1988), Argentine rugby union player
- Belisario Albán Mestanza (c. 1853–1925), Ecuadorian lawyer
- Belisario Porras Barahona (1856–1942), Panamanian journalist and politician
- Belisario Betancur (1923–2018), Colombian politician
- Belisario Corenzio (c. 1558 – 1643), Greek-Italian painter
- Belisario Domínguez (1863–1913), Mexican physician and politician
  - Belisario Domínguez Medal of Honor
- Belisario Mattera, Italian musician and mandolin virtuoso
- Belisario Salinas (1833–1893), Bolivian lawyer, teacher, and politician
- Belisario Sosa (1846–1933), Peruvian medical doctor and politician
- Belisario Suárez (1833–1910), Peruvian colonel and politician
- Belisario Velasco (1936–2023), Chilean politician and lawyer
- Belisario Villacís (1899-?), Ecuadorian long-distance runner

== Places ==
- Belisario Boeto Province, Bolivia
- Belisario Domínguez Dam, Chiapas, Mexico
- Belisario Domínguez Municipality, Chiapas, Mexico
- Dr. Belisario Domínguez Municipality, Chihuahua, Mexico
- Belisario Frías, Panama
- Belisario Porras, Panama

== See also ==
- Belisario (surname)
