= Joakim Vujić =

Serbian writer, dramatist, actor, traveler and polyglot

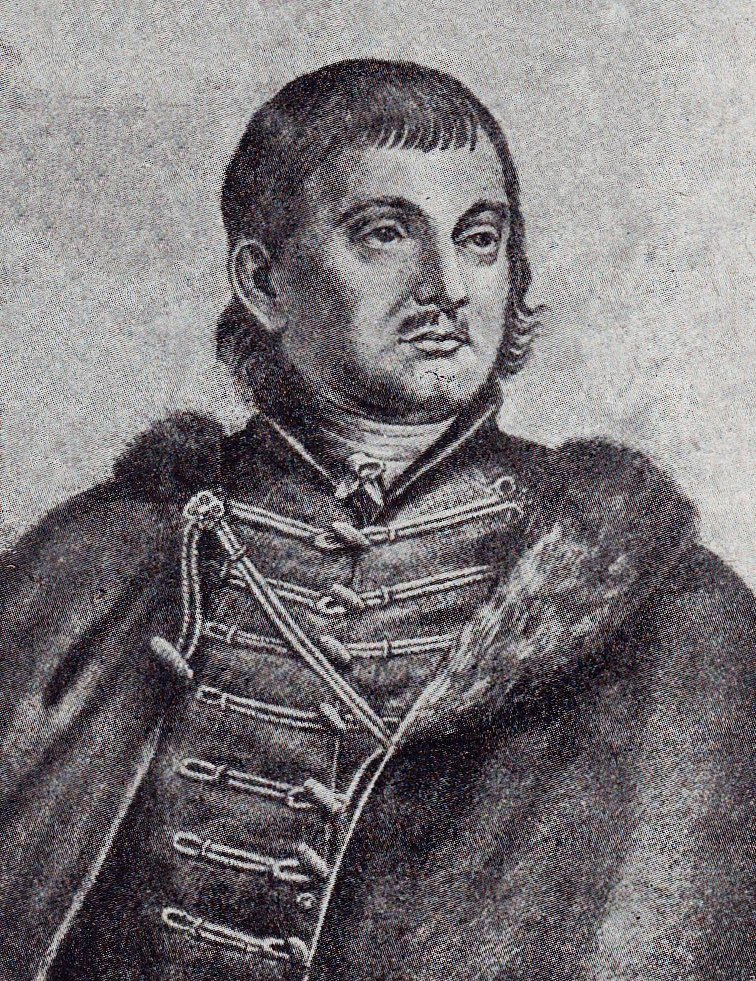
- Born: 9 September 1772 Baja, Kingdom of Hungary, Habsburg monarchy(today Hungary)
- Died: 8 November 1847 (aged 75)
- Occupation: Writer, dramatist, actor and traveler

Joakim Vujić (Serbian: Јоаким Вујић; 1772–1847) was a Serb writer, dramatist (musical stage and theatre), actor and traveler. He was one of the most accomplished Serbian dramatists and writers at the end of the 18th- and beginning of the 19th century. He was the first director of the Princely Serbian Theatre in Kragujevac founded in 1835. He is known as the Father of Serbian Theatre.

== Biography ==
Vujić was born on 9 September 1772 in Baja (now in Hungary), at that time a small Serb-inhabited town in the Habsburg monarchy situated on the bank of the Danube, an area of the Pannonian Plain known as "Rascia". His family hailed from southern Serbia and had fled during wars with the Ottoman Empire. Vujić was educated in Baja, first in the Serbian school, and then Latin, German, and Hungarian schools. He was further educated in Novi Sad, Kalocsa, and the Evangelical Lyceum in Bratislava. He became a teacher, primarily of foreign languages. He was a supporter of the Enlightenment and was a follower of Dositej Obradović, whom he met personally in Trieste's Serb community before Dositej left for Revolutionary Serbia.

Vujić had a feud with archpriest Mihailo Pejić, that began in Zemun in 1809; Vujić was incarcerated for several months and he blamed Pejić who had allegedly accused him of being "a state enemy" of the Austrian monarchy. There were no proof that Pejić was the cause of his arrest.

His career as a dramatic author began with the exhibition of a drama in or about the year 1813 and continued for almost thirty years. Before 1813, he incurred the hostility of the Austrian authorities, especially, it is said, of the Habsburgs, by the attacks which he made upon them on the stage in Zemun, and at their instance, he was imprisoned for a while. After writing a play during his imprisonment, in which he is said to have recanted, he was freed. His many travels and literary accomplishments established his influence in the new Serbian capital—Kragujevac—once and for all and at the same time knitted him closely to Prince Miloš, who recognized in him a man after his own heart, and made him the knaževsko-srbskog teatra direktor, the director of the Royal Serbian Theatre.

He made several voyages to the Black Sea and different places in southern Russia before returning to Serbia in 1842, where he died on 8 November 1847.

Joakim Vujić was a polyglot and spoke Italian, German, French, English, Hungarian, as well as Greek and Latin. He also learned some Hebrew.

== Work ==
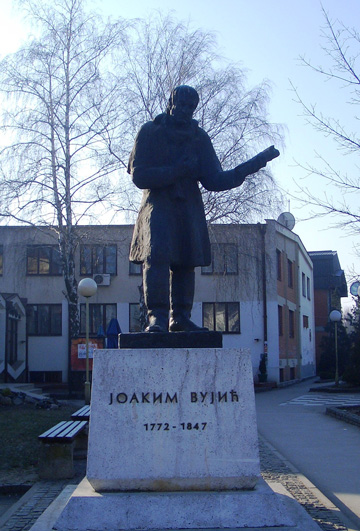
In front of the Knjaževsko-srpski teatar is the monument to the father of the Serbian theatre art – Joakim Vujić

He was one of the most productive Serbian writers of his time and left about fifty works, slightly more than half being published. At least one manuscript was destroyed during the World War II Bombing of Belgrade. He translated and adapted dramatic works (from German and Hungarian), wrote travel books, geographical textbooks, and translated novels. He compiled the first French grammar in the Serbian language (1805). He wrote in the so-called Slavo-Serbian language, a variant very close to the language of the people. Many Serbs subscribed to his publications, and he was, together with novelist Milovan Vidaković, one of the most widely read Serbian authors of his time. As such, he exercised a considerable influence on the broadening of the reading public among the Serbs. He seems to have also been among the first Serbian writers of travel books, for he began to write his first travel account as early as 1803 while touring Italy. His more important books of this kind are Travels in Serbia (1828) and Travels in Hungary, Wallachia, and Russia (1845). His famous autobiography – My Life—was also written in the form of a travel book.

Vujić lived and wrote in the time of the French Revolution (1789). He was a witness of the Napoleonic Wars, the Serbian Revolution, the actions of the Holy Alliance, and other great events in Europe in the period between the two revolutions (1789–1848): He wrote at the time of the national awakening in the Balkans. In his writings and theatrical work, he propagated progressive views, liberty, human rights, ethical ideas, and international cooperation. Although he was an Austrian subject, he was determined to serve Serbia as an intellectual and patriot.

Vujić is best known and most esteemed for his work in theatre. He organized stage performances in the Serb community of the Habsburg monarchy and in the Principality of Serbia. There were Serb theatrical companies at the time in Novi Sad, Pančevo, Kikinda, Sombor, and other places in Vojvodina. He was the first director of the Princely Serbian Theatre in Kragujevac founded in 1835. He is known as the Father of Serbian Theatre. Vujić was the organizer of the first theatrical performance in Serbian, which took place in the Hungarian theatre "Rondella" in Budapest on 24 August 1813. From 1813, if not earlier, to 1839 he organized, with the help of secondary school pupils and adult amateurs, performances in the Serbian language in many towns of the Austrian Empire.

Joakim Vujić translated or adapted 28 dramatic works. He was chiefly interested in German drama and August von Kotzebue seems to have been his favorite playwright, for he translated eight of Kotzebue's plays. He began his "studies of theatre arts" in Bratislava during his regular studies; he continued them in Trieste in Italy, and completed them in Budapest (1810–1815). The crucial event in his theatrical career was the performance of István Balog's heroic play about Karađorđe and the liberation of Belgrade, presented in the Hungarian Theatre in Budapest in 1812. His production of Black George or The Liberation of Belgrade from the Turks in Szeged and Novi Sad in 1815 led to censorship of the play and similar productions.

He produced about 25–30 plays in all, each of which represented a specific national and cultural achievement. He usually staged his translations and adaptations, and he ended his theatrical career with a production of Jovan Sterija Popović's popular comedy Kir Janja (Pančevo, 1839).

=== List of works ===
- Fernando i Jarika, jedna javnaja igra u trima djejstvijima, Budim, 1805
- Ljubovna zavist črez jedne cipele, jedna veselaja igra u jednom djejstviju, Budim, 1807
- Nagraždenije i nakazanije, jedna seoska igra u dva djejstvija, Budim, 1809
- Kreštalica, jedno javno pozorište u tri djejstvija, Budim, 1914
- Serpski vožd Georgij Petrovič, inače rečeni Crni ili Otjatije Beograda od Turaka. Jedno iroičesko pozorište u četiri djejstvija, Novi Sad, 1843
- Šnajderski kalfa, jedna vesela s pesmama igra u dva djejstvija, Beograd 1960. godine. Nabrežnoje pravo, dramatičeskoje pozorje, Belgrade, 1965
- Dobrodeljni derviš ili Zveketuša kapa, jedna volšebna igra u tri djejstvija, Kragujevac 1983
- Španjoli u Peruviji ili Rolova smert, 1812
- Nabrežnoje pravo, 1812
- Žertva smerti, 1812
- Sibinjska šuma, 1820
- Negri ili Ljubov ko sočolovjekom svojim, 1821
- Preduvjerenije sverhu sostojanija i roždenija, 1826
- Dobrodeljni derviš ili Zveketuša kapa, 1826
- Sestra iz Budima ili Šnajderski kalfa, 1826
- Paunika Jagodinka, 1832
- La Pejruz ili Velikodušije jedne divje, 1834
- Ljubovna zavist črez jedne cipele, 1805
- Stari vojak, 1816
- Kartaš, 1821
- Devojački lov 1826
- Obručenije ili Djetska dolžnost sverhu ljubve, 1826
- Svake dobre vešči jesu tri, 1826
- Siroma stihotvorac, 1826
- Seliko i Beriza ili LJubav izmeždu Negri, 1826
- Siroma tamburdžija, 1826
- Serbska princeza Anđelija, 1837
- Djevica iz Marijenburga, 1826
- Znajemi vampir, 1812

== Legacy ==
Soon after World War II and the formation of socialist Yugoslavia, the Yugoslav dramatic heritage was made an object of study in the newly established Academies for Theatre Arts in Belgrade, Zagreb, and Ljubljana. The events of 1948 contributed further to this search for cultural identity. The well-known production "The Theatre of Joakim Vujić", first shown in the vanguard theatre "Atelje 212" in Belgrade on 13 November 1958 (produced by Vladimir Petrić and directed by Josip Kulundžić, the founder of the Department of Dramaturgy in the Academy for Theatre Arts in Belgrade) marked not only the return of Vujić's works to the Serbian stage but also his artistic and personal rehabilitation.

== See also ==
- Marko Jelisejić (1766–1832)
- Jovan Rajić
- Arkadije Pejić
- Emanuel Kozačinski

== Sources ==
- Šumarević, Svetislav (1934). Dimitrije Davidović: biografski momenti. Narodna prosveta.
- Stojčić, Isidor (1913). Знаменити земунски Срби у XIX веку. Земун: Штампарија Исидора Стојчића.
- Jovan Skerlić, Istorija Nove Srpske Književnosti / History of Modern Serbian Literature (Belgrade, 1921), pp. 143–145.
