= Alexander Constantin Watzke Sr. =

Alexander Constantin Watzke, Senior, was born in Prenzlau, in the Ückermark district of the Kingdom of Prussia, now part of Germany, in 1836, the sixth of thirteen children born to Johann Watzke, roofer, and his first wife, Charlotte Dubois. Alexander's uncles, Anton and Franz, emigrated to Wisconsin in 1851, and Alexander and his brother, Ferdinand followed a year later and arrived in New Orleans in 1852. Ferdinand Rudolph Watzke left New Orleans to establish himself in Chicago.

Alexander became a prominent founder of the wool and hide business in the New Orleans area, he was also noted in his obituary to have been prominent in the city's German community as well as in the city's business and civic life generally.

Alexander married his wife Elizabeth Butscher (1836-1909) in New Orleans in the year of 1858. Elizabeth was also born in Germany, in Baden-Baden.

Alexander served one term in the Louisiana State Legislature from 1884 to 1888 during the Administration of Governor Samuel Douglas McEnery.

Alexander Constantin Watzke, Senior, and his wife Elizabeth parented the following eight children:

1. Bernadina (1858-1950) who married Andrew (Andreas) Rauch on 1-11-1879. She had a previous marriage to one named Seeling.

2. John Charles Watzke (1859-1882) who married Caroline Dinkel on 1-21-1882.

(They are believed to be the parents of jazz/ragtime musician and bandleader Alex (King) Watzke)

3. Caroline (1861-1863) died at age 19 months

4. Sophia (1865-1936) who married Henry Widmer on 9-22-1888

5. Emma Magdalena, known as Lena (born 1868) who married Joseph Cook on 6-12-1885

6. Alexander Constantin Watzke Jr. (1872-1928, no marriage, nor descendants, are known or recorded)

7. Phillipene (1874-1939) who married William Erslew on 8-25-1897

8. Charles A. Watzke (1876-1910) who married Pauline Pabst on 11-24-1898

Elizabeth Butscher Watzke died on 11-25-1909 at her home on 3207 S. Rampart St. in New Orleans. Alexander followed 5 years later on 8-28-1914. Both were interred in the family gravesite, St. Joseph's Cemetery No.1 in New Orleans, Louisiana. At the time of his death, the deceased had 15 grandchildren and 6 great-grandchildren. His descendants continue to be prominent in Louisiana, especially in the New Orleans area, but some are now in other parts of the United States, particularly Tennessee, Florida, and Mississippi. Watzke, being an immigrant, never owned any slaves, and the family takes great pride in that. Also, the family was split between North and South in the Civil War; having regard to their ages and recent immigration, no Watzke is recorded as having fought for either side in the Civil War. However, Alexander Constantin Watzke Jr. was a veteran of the Spanish–American War, and numerous descendants have served in the U.S. Armed forces, in wartime and in peacetime.
