= Robert B. Todd =

Robert B. Todd may refer to:

- Robert Barr Todd (1826–1901), American judge
- Robert Bentley Todd (1809–1860), Irish-born physician
