= Bellisari =

Bellisari is a surname. Notable people with the surname include:

- Greg Bellisari (born 1975), American football player
- Steve Bellisari (born 1980), American football player

== See also ==
- Bellisario
- Belisario (surname)
