= Bellisario =

Bellisario is an Italian surname. Notable people with the surname include:

- Andrew E. Bellisario (born 1956), American Roman Catholic bishop
- Donald P. Bellisario (born 1935), American television producer and screenwriter
  - Donald P. Bellisario College of Communications, Pennsylvania State University
- Giuseppe Bellisario (1821–1896), Italian painter
- Troian Bellisario (born 1985), American actress

== See also ==
- Belisario, an 1836 opera by Gaetano Donizetti
- Belisario (surname)
- Bellisari (surname)
