= James Jeffries (Louisiana politician) =

American politician (1836–1910)

James A. Jeffries (October 1836 – January 18, 1910) was the 20th lieutenant governor of Louisiana, with service from 1888 to 1892 under Governor Francis T. Nicholls. Jeffries was allied with the Nicholls faction of the Louisiana Democratic Party. While he was lieutenant governor, he also served as a member of the Democratic National Committee.

Jeffries was born in Kentucky but in 1859 was living in Washington County in southeast Texas, where he married the former Annie Munsen (or Munson). He is listed in the 1860 census for Milam County, Texas, as a lawyer and was the trustee/guardian for Annie's two siblings.

Annie J. Jeffries, wife of James Jeffries, died in Cameron in Milam County on 26 May 1861. Jeffries then served as a private in Company F of the 8th TX Infantry Confederate States of America during the Civil War. He became a member of the General Leroy Stafford Camp #3 of the United Confederate Veterans. On July 27, 1865, in Alexandria, Louisiana, he wed Mary E (or Lillie) Meade, daughter of Stephen Meade of the nearby Avoca Plantation. Jeffries is interred at Greenwood Cemetery in Shreveport in Caddo Parish in northwestern Louisiana, where he lived in his later years.

Political offices
Preceded by Clay Knobloch	Lieutenant Governor of Louisiana; 1888–1892	Succeeded by Charles Parlange
