= Clay Knobloch =

American politician

Henry Clay Knobloch, also spelled Knoblock, (November 25, 1839 – May 19, 1903) was the 19th lieutenant governor of Louisiana from 1885 to 1889 serving under Governor Samuel D. McEnery.

== Early life and Civil War ==
Knobloch was from Thibodaux, Louisiana and he served in the American Civil War as Sergeant of Company I of the 26th Louisiana Infantry in the Confederate Army. In 1867, Knobloch married Flavia Knight.

== Political career ==
Knobloch was a supporter of the McEnery faction of the Louisiana Democratic Party. In 1884 Knobloch ran for and was elected Lieutenant Governor but he was defeated in the Democratic Primary when he ran for reelection in 1888. He lost to James Jeffries who was affiliated with the Nicholls faction of the party, even losing his own parish. He blamed his defeat in Lafourche Parish on State Senator E.A. O'Sullivan who represented the Parish in the legislature. In February 1889 they came to blows on the streets of Thibodaux and one week later Knobloch challenged O'Sullivan to a duel. They met on the dueling grounds at the Oaks in New Orleans on March 1, 1889, with O'Sullivan choosing swords as the method for the duel. When the parties were assembled at the Oaks, it was determined that the ground was too wet with dew to allow sword fighting and after a brief parley, the dispute was resolved without violence.

== Death ==
Knobloch was shot and killed on May 18, 1903, in downtown Thibodaux, Louisiana by barber James Cherault. Evidence from a preliminary hearing showed the men quarreled over a woman, and Cherault shot Knobloch in self-defense.

Political offices
Preceded by George L. Walton (D)	Lieutenant Governor of Louisiana; 1884–1888	Succeeded by James Jeffries (D)
