= John Thornton (American politician) =

American politician from Louisiana (1846–1917)

John Randolph Thornton
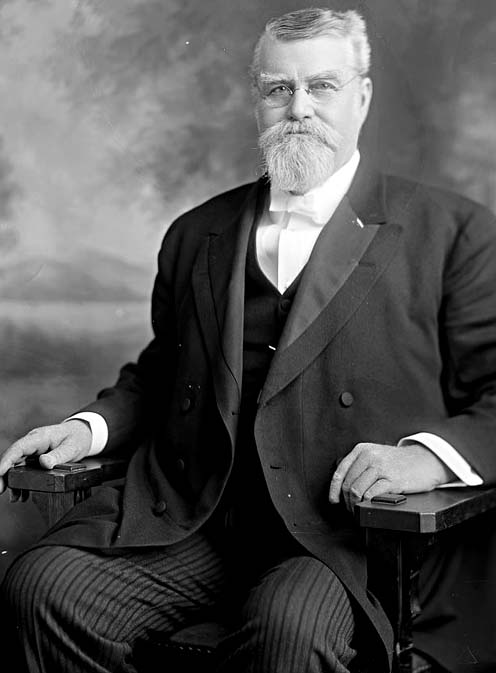

United States Senator from Louisiana
- In office December 7, 1910 – March 3, 1915
- Appointed by: Jared Y. Sanders Sr., August 27, 1910
- Preceded by: Samuel D. McEnery
- Succeeded by: Robert F. Broussard

Personal details
- Born: August 25, 1846 Iberville Parish, Louisiana, U.S.
- Died: December 28, 1917 (aged 71) Alexandria, Louisiana, U.S.
- Resting place: Rapides Cemetery; Pineville, Louisiana, U.S.
- Party: Democratic

Military service
- Allegiance: Confederate States of America
- Branch/service: Confederate States Army
- Years of service: 1863–1865
- Rank: Private
- Unit: 2nd Louisiana Cavalry

John Randolph Thornton (August 25, 1846 – December 28, 1917) was a United States senator from Louisiana.

== Biography ==
Born on Notoway plantation (near White Castle, Iberville Parish), he moved with his parents to Rapides Parish in 1853. He attended Parker Seminary (Pineville), the McGruder Institute (Baton Rouge) and the Louisiana Seminary (afterwards the Louisiana State University) at Pineville until 1863. He enlisted in the Confederate States Army and served until the close of the Civil War in Company B, Second Louisiana Cavalry.

He engaged in agricultural pursuits until 1877, studied law, was admitted to the bar in 1877 and commenced practice in Rapides Parish. He was judge of Rapides Parish from 1878 to 1880 and a delegate to the State constitutional convention in 1898. From 1904 to 1910 he was a member of the board of Supervisors of the State university.

Thornton was appointed as a Democrat to the U.S. Senate on August 27, 1910, and was subsequently elected to fill the vacancy caused by the death of Samuel D. McEnery, serving from December 7, 1910, to March 3, 1915; he was not a candidate for reelection to the Senate. While in the Senate he was chairman of the Committee on Fisheries (Sixty-third Congress). He was appointed by President Woodrow Wilson a member of the Board of Ordnance and Fortification and served from 1915 to 1917, and resumed the practice of law in Alexandria, Louisiana; he died there in 1917. Interment was in Rapides Cemetery, Pineville.

== Sources ==
- United States Congress. "John Thornton (id: T000241)". Biographical Directory of the United States Congress. Retrieved on 2008-02-14

U.S. Senate
Preceded by Samuel D. McEnery	U.S. senator (Class 3) from Louisiana; December 7, 1910 – March 3, 1915; Served alongside: Murphy J. Foster, Joseph E. Ransdell	Succeeded by Robert F. Broussard
