= Samuel D. McEnery =

American politician and judge (1837–1910)

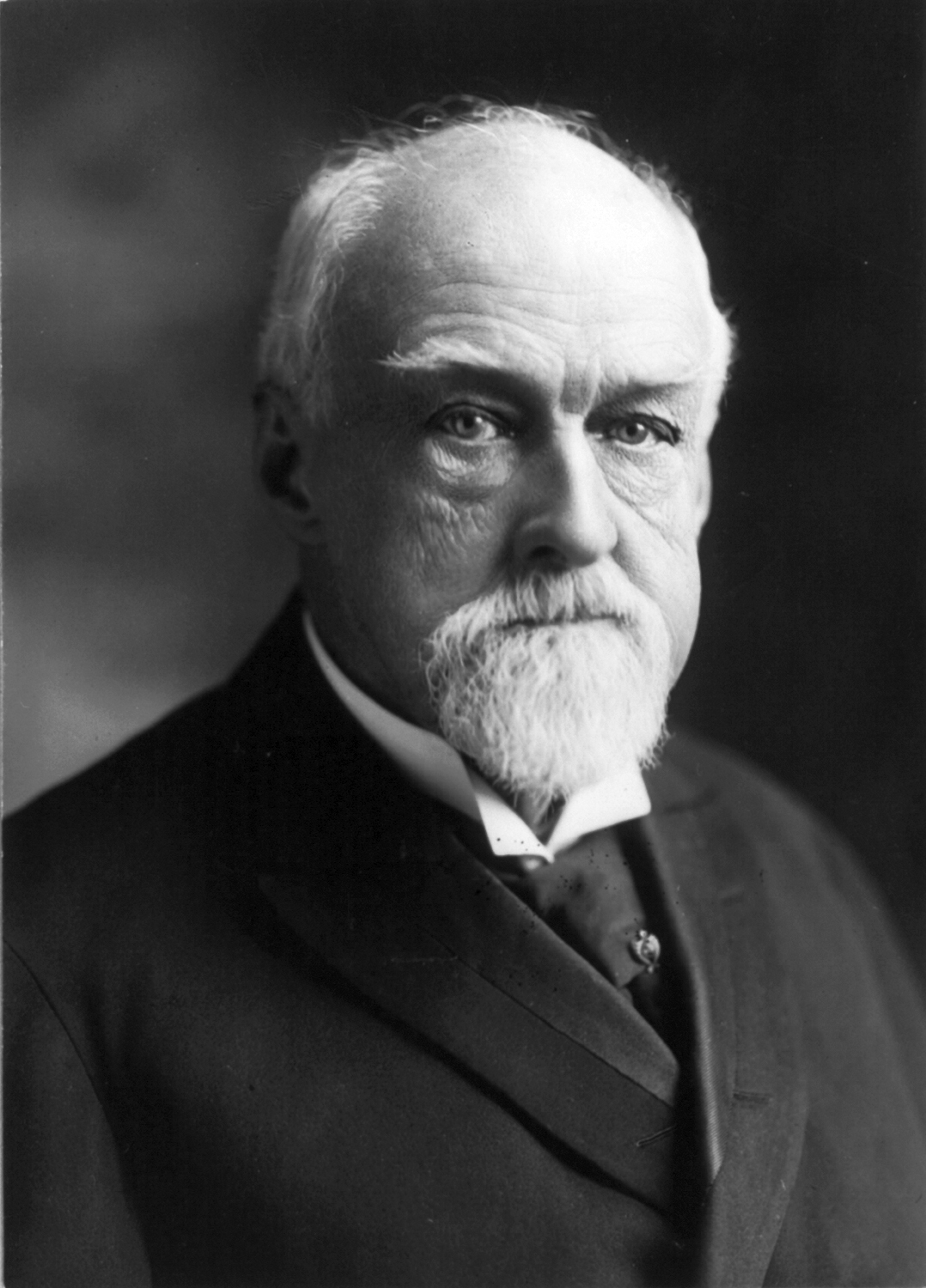
- McEnery in 1908

United States Senator from Louisiana
- In office March 4, 1897 – June 28, 1910
- Preceded by: Newton C. Blanchard
- Succeeded by: John Thornton

30th Governor of Louisiana
- In office October 16, 1881 – May 20, 1888
- Lieutenant: W.A. Robertson; George L. Walton; Clay Knobloch
- Preceded by: Louis A. Wiltz
- Succeeded by: Francis T. Nicholls

16th Lieutenant Governor of Louisiana
- In office January 14, 1880 – October 16, 1881
- Governor: Louis A. Wiltz
- Preceded by: Louis A. Wiltz
- Succeeded by: W. A. Robertson

Personal details
- Born: Samuel Douglas McEnery; May 28, 1837 Monroe, Louisiana
- Died: June 28, 1910 (aged 73) New Orleans, Louisiana
- Party: Democratic
- Education: Spring Hill College; United States Naval Academy; University of Virginia; State and National Law School (New York)

Samuel Douglas McEnery (May 28, 1837 – June 28, 1910) served as the 30th governor of Louisiana from 1881 until 1888. He was subsequently a U.S. senator from 1897 until 1910. He was the brother of John McEnery, one of the candidates in the contested 1872 election for governor.

== Early life ==
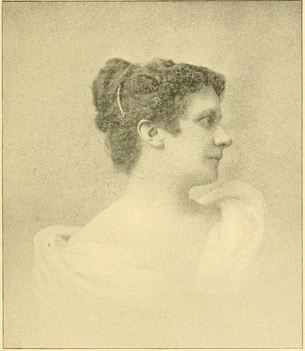
Mrs Samuel D. McEnery

McEnery was born in Monroe in Ouachita Parish in North Louisiana. He attended Spring Hill College in Mobile, Alabama, the United States Naval Academy in Annapolis, Maryland, and the University of Virginia at Charlottesville, Virginia. In 1859, McEnery graduated from the State and National Law School in Poughkeepsie, New York. McEnery served as a lieutenant in the Confederate States Army during the Civil War.

== Career ==
In 1866, McEnery began practicing law in Monroe. He became active in the Democratic Party, and served as its chairman in Ouachita Parish. He was elected lieutenant governor in 1879, and became Governor of Louisiana in 1881 after the death of Louis A. Wiltz. McEnery was elected to a full term as governor in 1884, but failed to be re-elected in 1888. McEnery's administration was weak because of the power wielded by the State Treasurer Edward A. Burke and the corrupt Louisiana State Lottery Company. Despite Louisiana's Roman Catholic plurality (and majority in Acadiana and many of the southern parishes of the state), McEnery was the last Catholic to be elected governor prior to Edwin Edwards in 1972.

After losing the 1888 election, McEnery was appointed to serve as an associate justice in the Louisiana Supreme Court. He was elected to serve in the United States Senate in 1896, serving there until his death in 1910. While in the Senate, McEnery served on the Committee of Corporations formed in the District of Columbia and the Committee of Transportation and Sale of Meat Products. He was a member of The Boston Club of New Orleans.

== Death ==
McEnery died on June 28, 1910, in New Orleans and was interred there at Metairie Cemetery.

== See also ==
- List of members of the United States Congress who died in office (1900–1949)

== Notes ==
Party political offices
Preceded by Louis A. Wiltz	Democratic nominee for Governor of Louisiana; 1884	Succeeded by Francis T. Nicholls
Preceded by Francis T. Nicholls	Democratic nominee for Governor of Louisiana; 1892	Succeeded by Murphy J. Foster
Political offices
Preceded by Louis A. Wiltz	Lieutenant Governor of Louisiana; 1880-1881	Succeeded by W.A. Robertson
Preceded by Louis A. Wiltz	Governor of Louisiana; 1881–1888	Succeeded by Francis T. Nicholls
Preceded by Robert Barr Todd	Justice of the Louisiana Supreme Court; 1888-1891	Succeeded by Lynn B. Watkins
U.S. Senate
Preceded by Newton C. Blanchard	US Senator (Class 3) from Louisiana; 1897–1910	Succeeded by John R. Thornton
