= Bombing of Belgrade =

The bombing of Belgrade may refer to:

- Bombing of Belgrade (1862)
- Bombardment of Belgrade (1914)
- Bombing of Belgrade in World War II
  - Bombing of Belgrade (April 1941)
  - Bombing of Belgrade (April–September 1944)
  - Bombing of Belgrade (September–October 1944)
- Bombing of Belgrade during the 1999 NATO bombing of Yugoslavia, part of the Kosovo War
