= Jacques Amans =

French painter

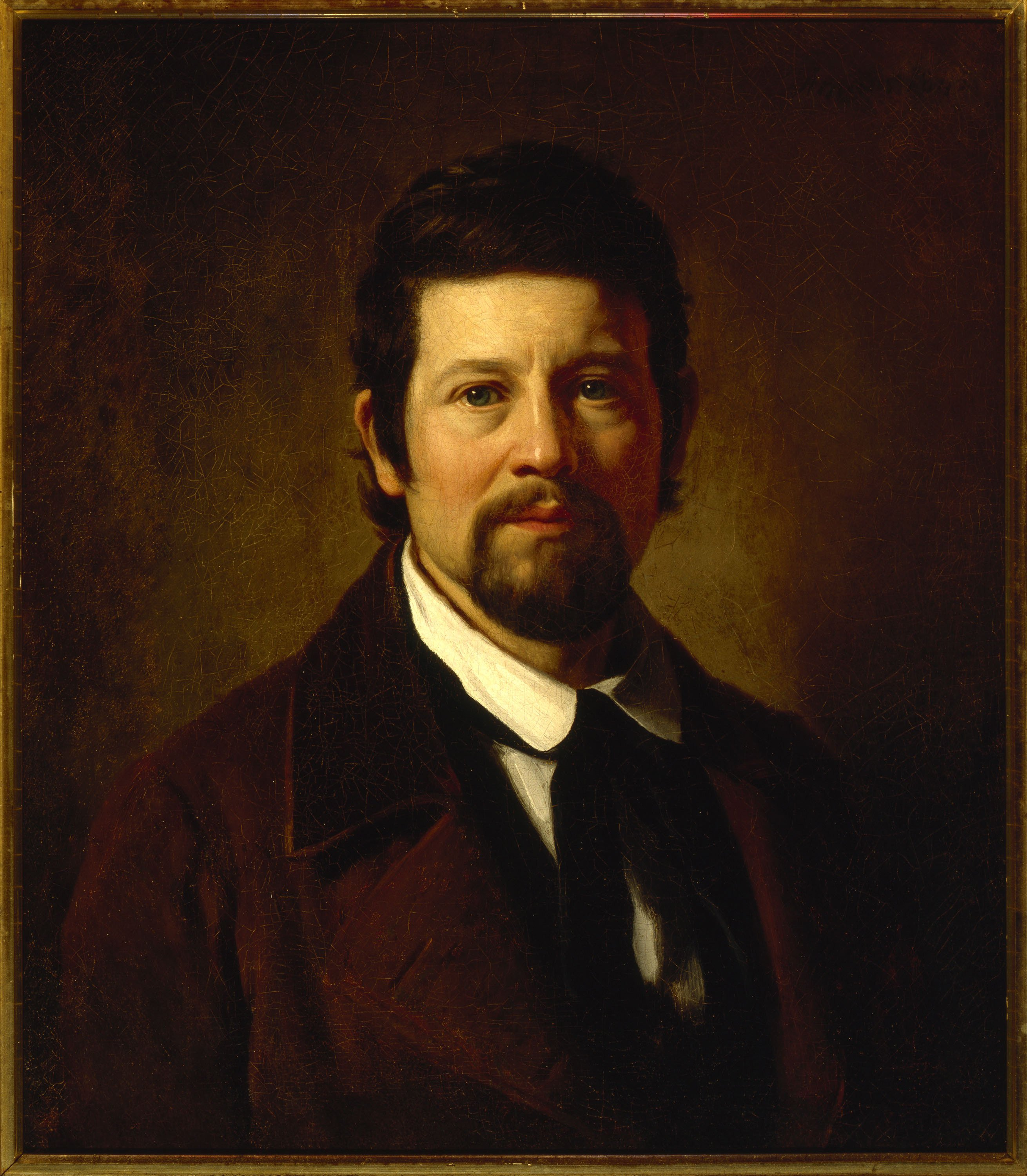
- Self-portrait, 1845
- Born: May 29, 1801; Maastricht, The Netherlands
- Died: January 10, 1888 (aged 86); Lévis-Saint-Nom, Yvelines, France
- Notable work: Belizaire and the Frey Children
- Movement: Neoclassicism
- Spouse: Azoline Landreaux
- Patrons: Andrew Jackson, Zachary Taylor

Jacques Guillaume Lucien Amans (29 May 1801 – 10 January 1888) was a French neoclassical portrait painter working in New Orleans in the 1840s and 1850s.

== Life and career ==
Amans was born in Maastricht, at the time under the control of France. His father, Paul Serge Amans, was born in Narbonne in 1765 and became a French officer (Capitaine-Adjudant de place de 1ère classe à Maastricht) in Napoleon's army. He was trained in the French neoclassical tradition of portraiture and exhibited at the Paris Salon from 1831 to 1837. News of fellow artist Jean Vaudechamp’s good fortune in finding patrons probably led Amans to visit Louisiana, given that the two artists traveled on the same ship from France to New Orleans around 1837. Following Vaudechamp’s departure from Louisiana in 1839, Amans assumed the role as the most celebrated portraitist in Louisiana. In the mid-1840s, he married Azoline Landreaux, the daughter of St. Charles Parish sugar planter Pierre Honoré Landreaux and Joséphine Armant, and purchased Trinity Plantation on Bayou Lafourche. In 1856, Louisiana planter Robert Ruffin Barrow Sr. persuaded Amans to remain in Louisiana longer to paint an almost life-sized portrait of his wife, Volumnia Washington Hunley Barrow, sister of Confederate submarine captain Horace Hunley, and their daughter, Volumnia Roberta. The portrait now hangs in Residence Plantation House on Volumnia Farm in Terrebonne Parish, Louisiana. The same year, in 1856, Amans and Azoline returned to France, where he died in 1888 at Château de Lévis Saint Nom, aged 87, never having the chance to return to Louisiana.

== Work ==
Clara Mazureau, whose portrait Amans painted when she was a young girl, was the daughter of Aimée Grima and Étienne Mazureau, Attorney General of Louisiana. Amans completed the portraits of several members of the Grima and Mazureau families in the 1840s. As in the Clara Mazureau portrait, Amans favored the three quarter length pose.

Amans' painting, Bélizaire and the Frey Children, depicts an enslaved Afro-Creole teenager, Bélizaire, with the children of the Frey family. The presence of Bélizaire was concealed, but revealed during conservation treatment. The work is in collection of the Metropolitan Museum of Art.

Influenced by the French neoclassical artists Jean-Auguste-Dominique Ingres and Jacques-Louis David, Amans emphasized meticulous draftsmanship and realism with particular attention to the sitter’s face and hands.

== Famous subjects ==
Among Amans' most famous subjects was President Andrew Jackson, who sat for his portrait in 1840 (the 25th Anniversary of the Battle of New Orleans). The painting is rich in details of both physiognomy and surroundings and shows an elderly, though not frail, former president.

== Gallery ==
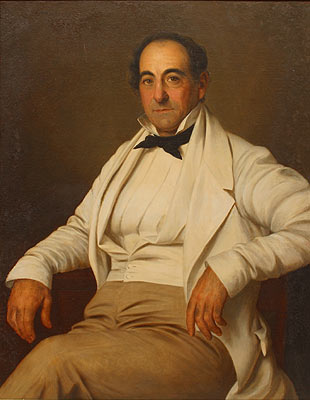
Portrait of Michel Douradou Bringier (1843)

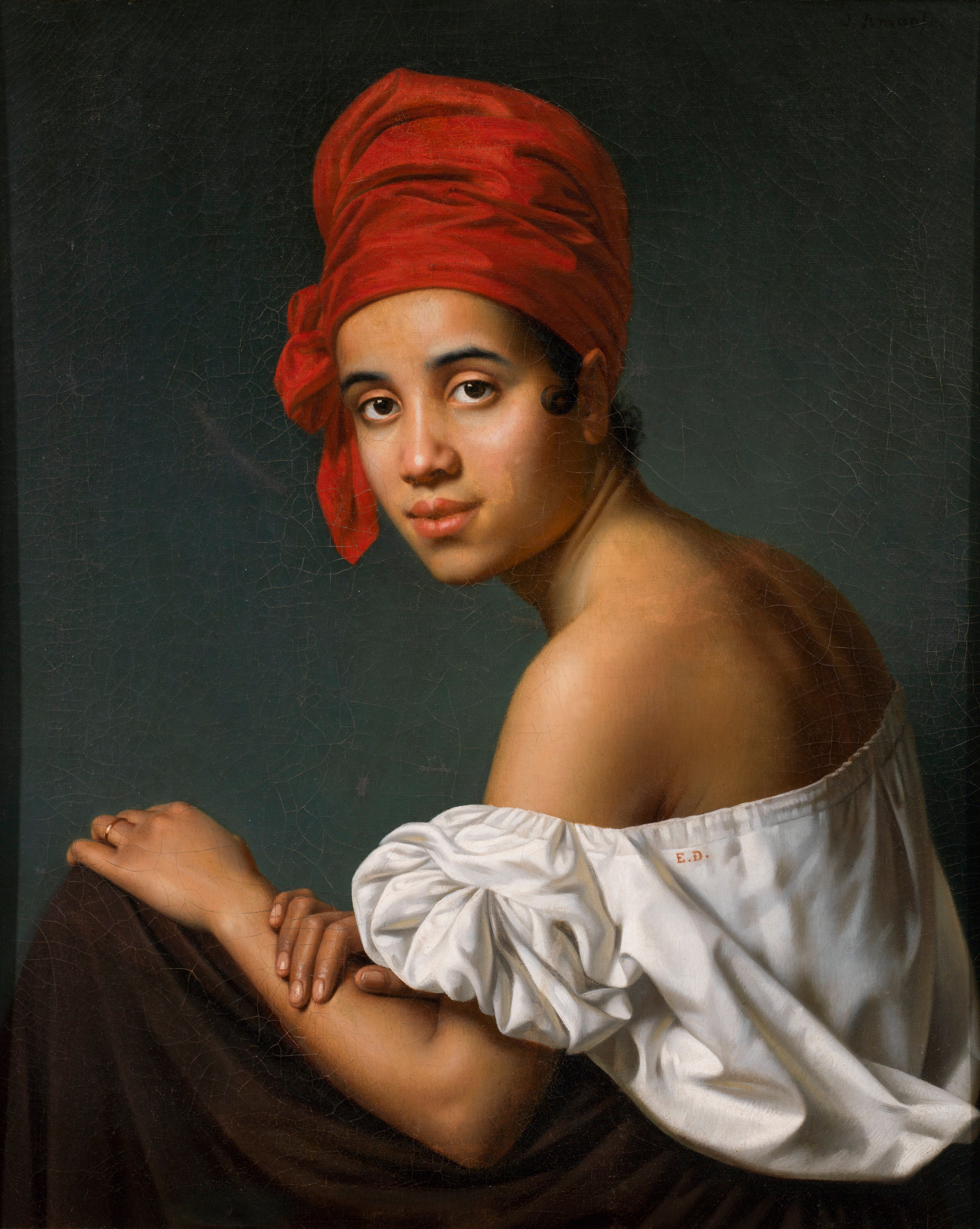
Portrait of a Creole woman in a red tignon (c. 1840)

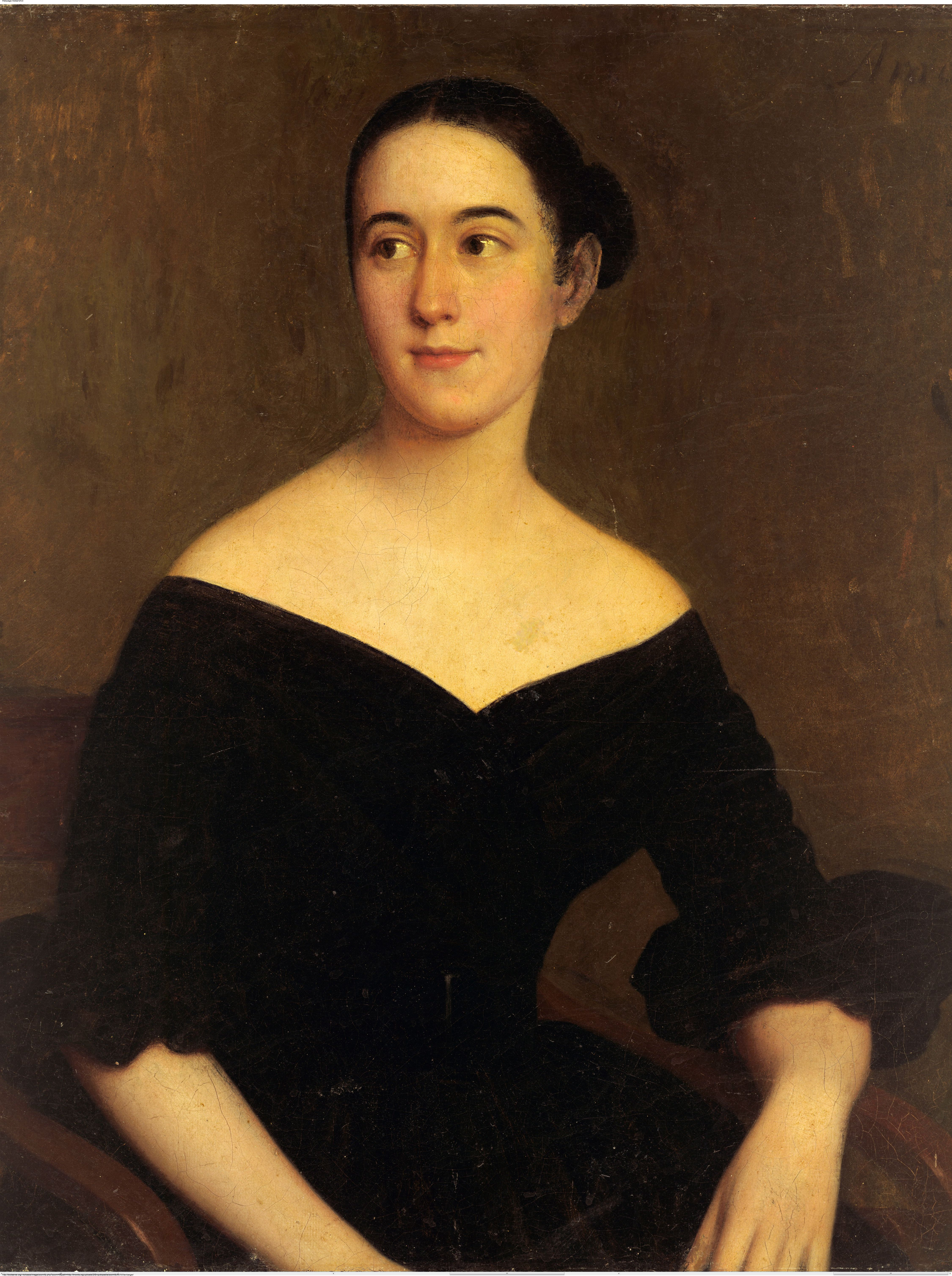
Portrait of Mrs. Gustave Miltenberger (née Corinne Knott) (1840)

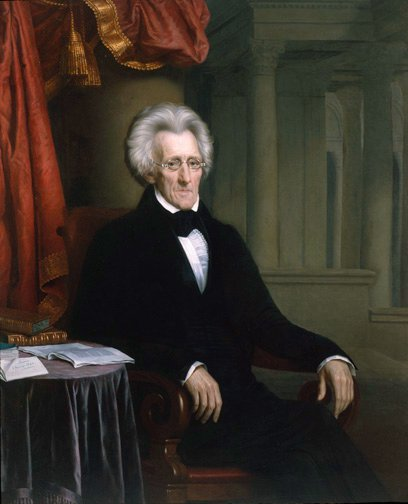
Portrait of Andrew Jackson (1840)

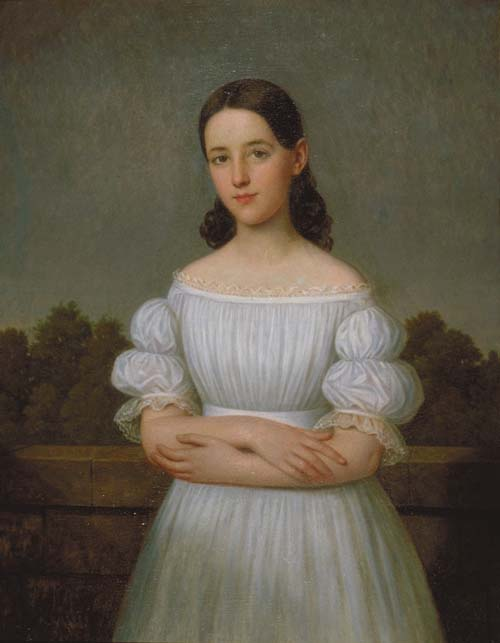
Portrait of Clara Mazureau (1838)

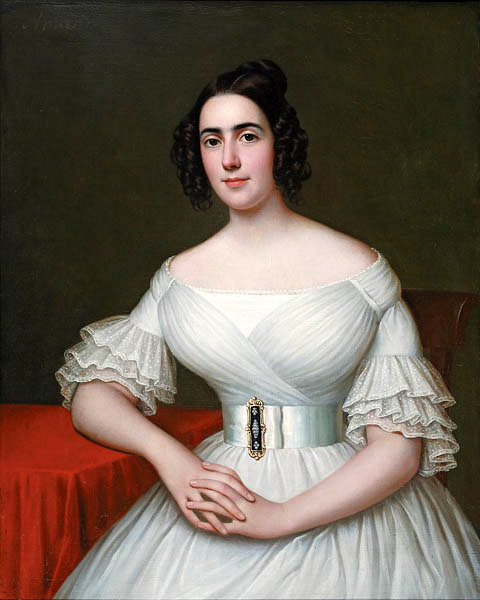
Portrait of Mme Augustine Massicot Tanneret (1835)

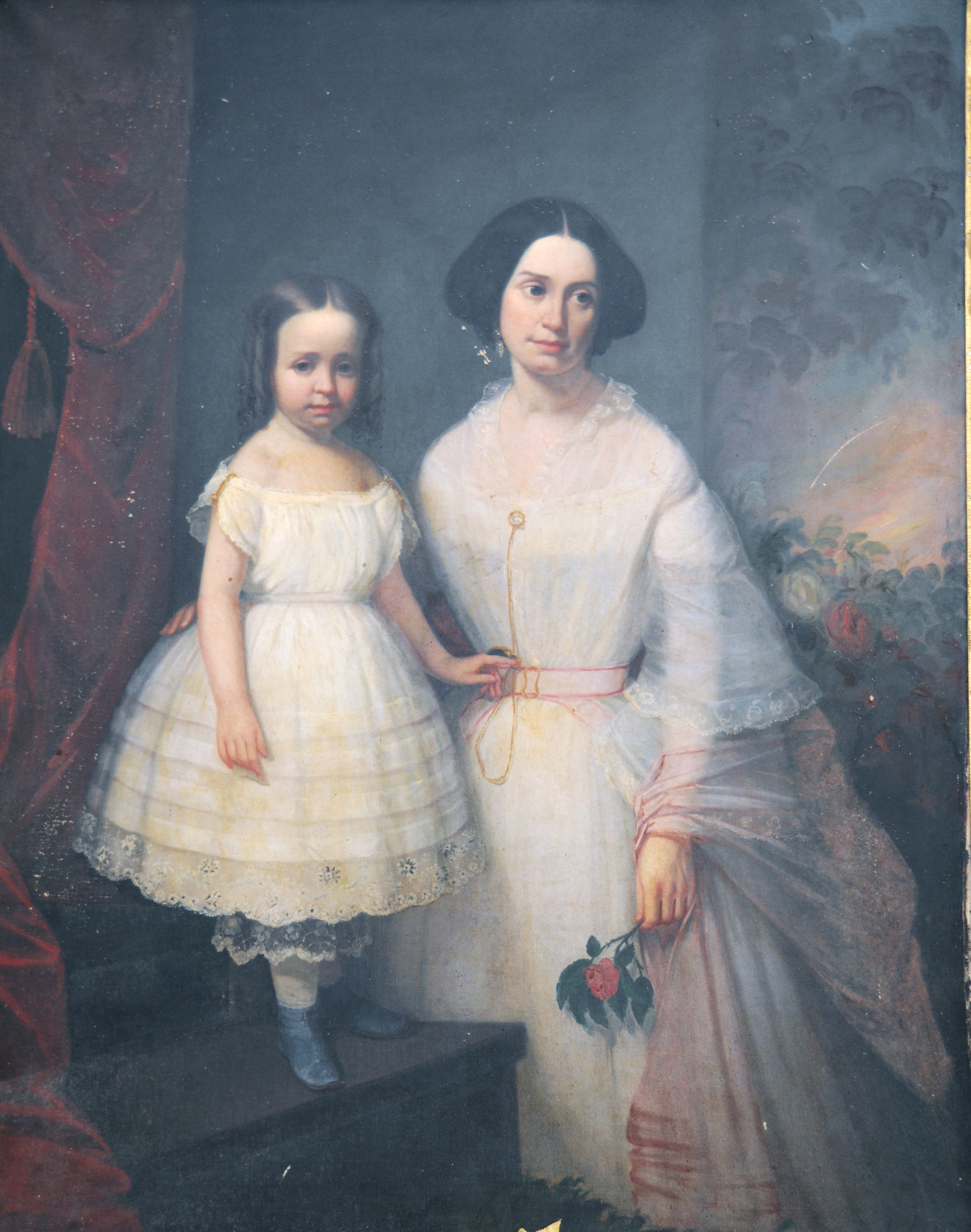
Portrait of Volumnia Washington Hunley Barrow (1856), Volumnia Farm, Houma, LA

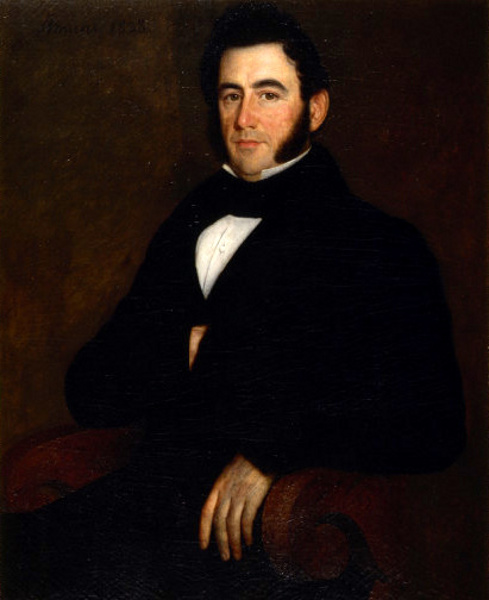
Portrait of François Gabriel "Valcour" Aimé (1838)

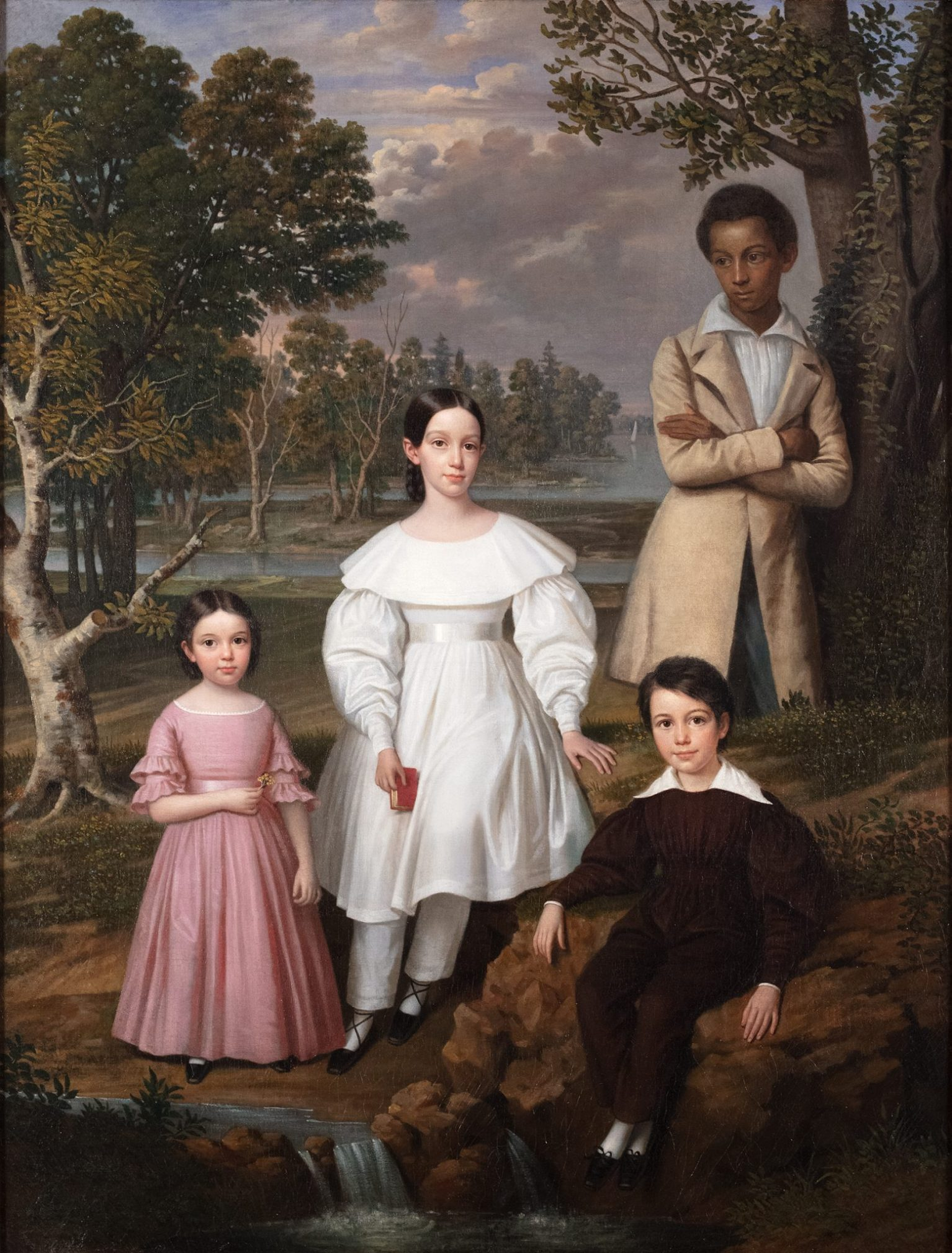
Bélizaire and the Frey Children, c. 1837
