= Bélizaire and the Frey Children =

1837 portrait painting attributed to Jacques Amans

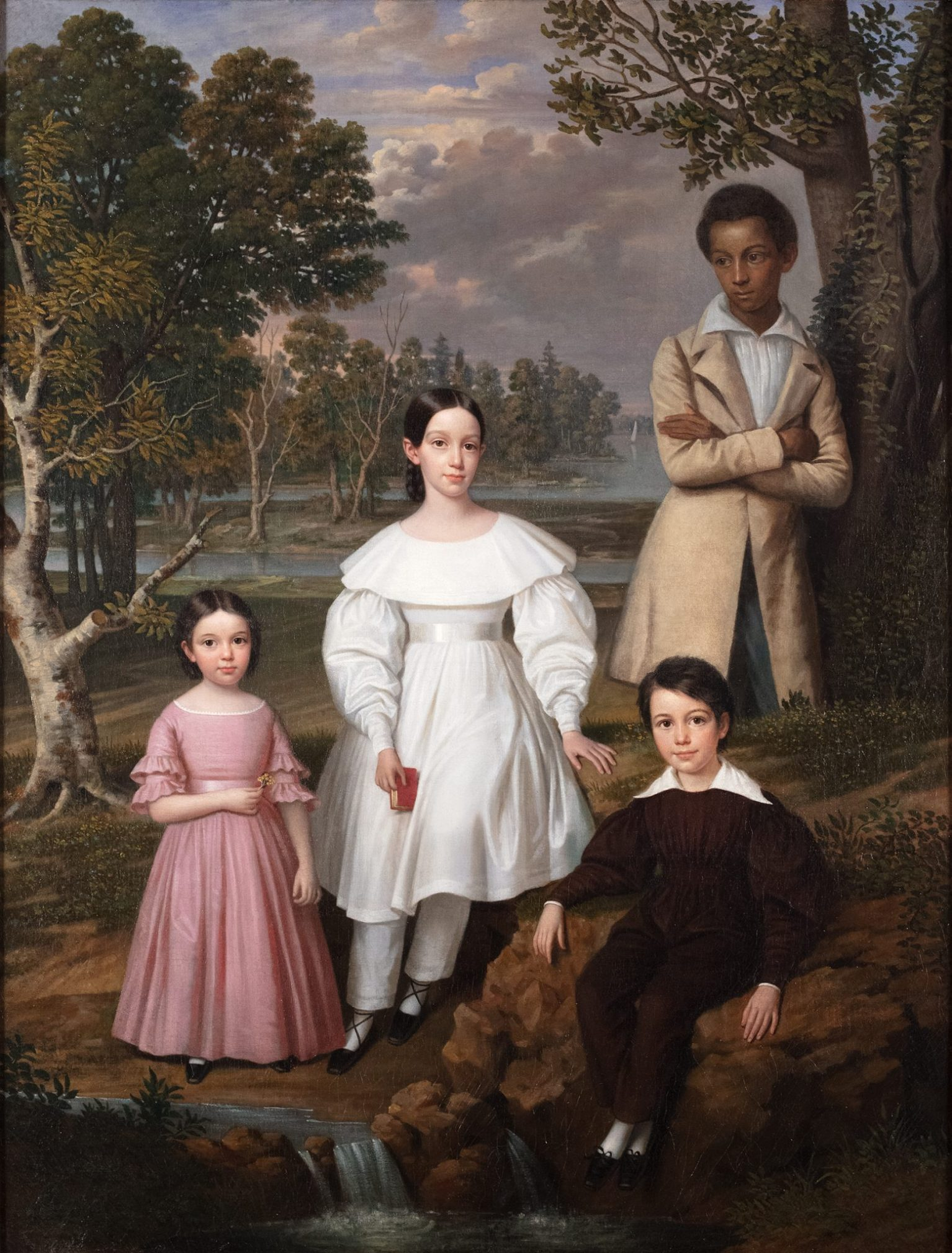
- Pictured are Bélizaire (1822–after 1865), an enslaved Afro-Creole boy, with Léontine Frey (1833–1837), Élisabeth Coralie Frey (1828–1837), and Frédéric Émile Frey Jr. (1832–1846), children of his enslavers, Frédéric and Coralie Frey
- Artist: Jacques Amans
- Year: 1837

Bélizaire and the Frey Children is an 1837 group portrait painting attributed to the artist Jacques Amans that is a rare example of period work of an enslaved person who is painted in a naturalistic manner. It is in the collection of the Metropolitan Museum of Art, in New York.

The painting shows the enslaved Afro-Creole teenager Bélizaire together with the three children of the wealthy German-born New Orleans merchant, financier, and possible diplomat Frederick or Frédéric Frey.

Frey's family purchased Bélizaire and his mother, Sallie, in 1828 for $750. Bélizaire, six years old at the time, was of mixed race, and these two factors enabled his positive identification. The bill of sale survives.

He had siblings who had been sold and separated from Sallie. Bélizaire was born in the French Quarter in New Orleans. Historical records do not identify his father. The Freys also enslaved a number of other people in addition to Bélizaire and his mother, Sallie. The Frey family resided in a three-story townhouse near the French Quarter. His inclusion in the group portrait likely signifies Bélizaire’s importance to the Frey family. Ship logs indicate that Bélizaire accompanied Frédéric Frey when he traveled. Bélizaire was likely tasked with caring for the three Frey children, Élisabeth Coralie, born in 1828; Frédéric Émile, born in 1832, and Léontine, born in 1833. His appearance in the portrait is more like a peer or a half-sibling than of a slave, since Bélizaire is as well-dressed as the three younger children in the portrait and poses with confidence. While his exact relationship to the Frey family is not known, it has been speculated that he could be related by blood to the other children in the portrait, as a son of Frédéric Frey. “Children of the plantation” were not uncommon in New Orleans, though there is no record of contact between Frey and Sallie before Frey purchased her, much less a shared household seven years prior. Bélizaire was born in approximately 1822, so would have been about 15 years old when the portrait was painted. Two of the Frey children in the painting, Élisabeth and Léontine, died of yellow fever in 1837, the year the portrait was painted. Their brother, Frédéric Émile Frey Jr., died in 1846 at the age of 13 or 14. The youngest Frey child, a girl who was not included in the portrait, was the only one of the Frey children to survive to adulthood.

The Frey family experienced financial difficulties during a recession. According to one family story, Frédéric Frey became angry with Bélizaire, sold him, and had him painted out of the portrait. Technical examination of the painting, however, indicates that he was painted out long after Frey's death. Records show that Bélizaire was sold in 1841, when he was about nineteen, to pay off the Frey family’s debts, though the Frey family bought him back soon afterwards. Frédéric Frey died in 1851. Following Frédéric Frey’s death, his businesses went bankrupt. His widow, Marie Colette Coralie Favre D'aunoy Frey, later sold Bélizaire for $1,200 to sugar planter Lézin Becnel in 1857 to be enslaved on the Evergreen Plantation. Bélizaire‘s mother, Sallie, who was a cook, was also sold to the Evergreen Plantation at this time. Bélizaire worked there as an enslaved domestic servant. Records show that Bélizaire was sold at least three times, but survived to be emancipated at the end of the American Civil War. The last known record of him appears in the 1865 records of the Freedmen's Bureau in New Orleans, a discovery made by retired geneologist Katherine Flynn. He was 37 years old at the time. The painting is the only known image that exists of one of the 400 persons who were enslaved at the Evergreen Plantation.

== History of the painting ==
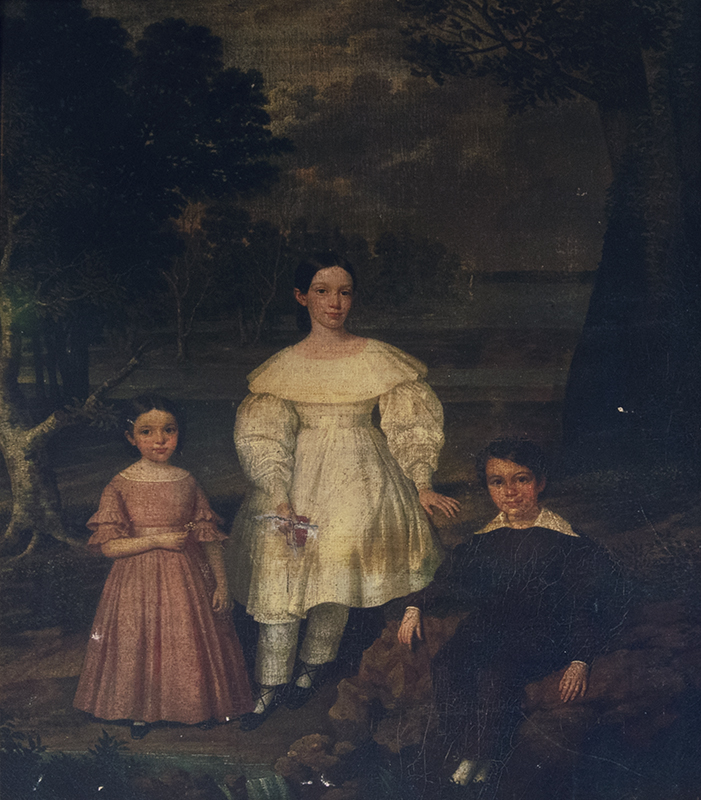
Overpainted state, sold in 2005

It is uncertain exactly when the figure of Bélizaire was painted out of the composition. According to one family legend, it happened around the time he was sold. Because cracks had formed on the surface of the paint before the figure of Bélizaire had been painted out, the repainting is thought to have taken place around the turn of the 20th century. At this time, the whites in New Orleans were unlikely to want to display a painting with a mixed race subject. When the family donated the painting to the New Orleans Museum of Art in 1972, the museum was informed that an enslaved person had been painted out, but no action was taken by the museum.

The painting was deaccessioned from the museum's collection in 2004, and auctioned at Christie's in 2005. The buyer had the overpaint removed from Bélizaire's portrait by conservator Katja Grauman in 2005. She began by treating small areas. The New York Times reproduces a pre-treatment photographic detail, in which Bélizaire's image is faintly visible.

The Baton Rouge-based collector Jeremy K. Simien, who researches multi-racial Creole culture and history, had been searching for the painting for years. He purchased it in 2021, after he alerted the New Orleans Museum and it did not show interest in the painting. Simien had it further restored by Craig Crawford, who removed remaining overpaint. (Crawford had earlier restored another New Orleans painting where lace had been painted over because a restorer had incorrectly determined that the subject would not have worn lace, because of her race.) Simien also commissioned the historian Katy Morlas Shannon to research Bélizaire's identity and history, thus recovering his name and year of birth, which was previously unrecorded in the museum documentation.

When Simien learned that Bélizaire had lived long enough to be free, that knowledge "lifted a weight of sorrow I hadn’t realized I was carrying. I have often referred to him as ‘Our Bélizaire,’ because his story belongs to all of us now." Simien added: "I believe the painting of Bélizaire and its story of erasure is very much akin to Black history in the United States: erased, recovered, and now — hopefully — celebrated and included in mainstream narratives.”

The painting was purchased by the Metropolitan Museum of Art in 2023 and is currently on view in the American Wing. Additionally, the Metropolitan was given a painting attributed to John Heaton called Child of the Van Rensselaer Family with Servant (c. 1730), which, according to the museum website, is the “only known naturalistic likeness of a colonial Black resident of Albany,” New York. It hangs next to the Bélizaire portrait, close to Emanuel Leutze's Washington Crossing the Delaware (1851), as the museum celebrates the 250th anniversary of the U.S.

== Significance ==
The painting is the "first naturalistic portrait of a named Black subject set in a Southern landscape" in the American Wing of the Metropolitan Museum. Multiple commentators have noted that the Bélizaire portrait stands in for all the Black and multi-ethnic people who have gone unrepresented in American history. Its display is part of a national trend in museums and Southern historic sites to "address their history of slavery and how ... wealth was accumulated". From July 1, 2022–January 29, 2023, the Ogden Museum of Southern Art displayed the painting; from October 12, 2023–July 1, 2024, the Metropolitan Museum of Art displayed the painting in the American Wing.
