= Robert Barr Todd =

American judge (1826–1901)

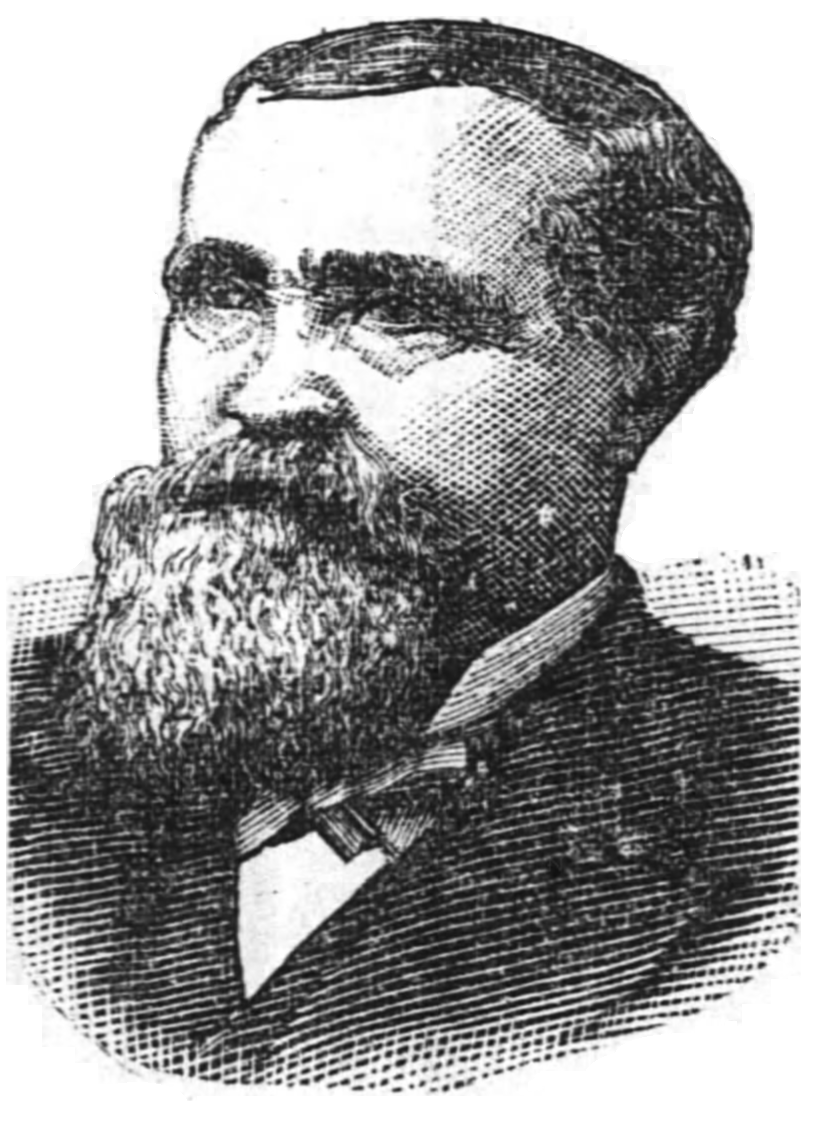
Robert Barr Todd as depicted in 1887.

Robert Barr Todd (1826–February 4, 1901) was a justice of the Louisiana Supreme Court from April 5, 1880 to June 11, 1888.

Todd's birthplace was Lexington, Kentucky. Born in Missouri, Todd's parents were state court judge David Todd and Eliza Barr, and his grandfather was pioneer Levi Todd. Todd graduated from the University of Missouri in 1843 received an A.M. from that institution in 1845, gaining admission to the bar that same year. Robert and his cousin were the first two graduates of the new University. In 1846, Todd accompanied Alexander William Doniphan on a military expedition to Mexico, returning the following year, and then settling in Louisiana in 1848. He participated in the 1860 Secession Convention, voting in favor of secession, and in the Constitutional Convention of 1879, which created the new court to which Todd was appointed the following year.

Todd married Anne Ruth Brigham on October 17, 1850.

On February 4, 1901, Todd died at his daughter's home in Brooklyn, New York, at the age of 75.

Political offices
| Preceded by Newly reconstituted court. | Justice of the Louisiana Supreme Court; 1880–1888 | Succeeded by Samuel D. McEnery |
