= William A. Robertson =

American politician

Dr. W. A. Robertson

Lieutenant Governor of Louisiana & President of the Louisiana State Senate
- In office October 16, 1881 – December 24, 1881
- Governor: Samuel D. McEnery
- Preceded by: Samuel D. McEnery
- Succeeded by: George L. Walton

State Senator for St. Landry Parish
- In office 1871–1884

Personal details
- Born: William Allen Robertson; October 22, 1837 South Windsor, Connecticut
- Died: October 26, 1889 (aged 52) near Washington, Louisiana
- Party: Democratic
- Education: University of Louisiana
- Profession: Physician, surgeon

William Allen Robertson (October 22, 1837 – October 26, 1889) was President of the Louisiana State Senate and the acting lieutenant governor of Louisiana for two and a half months in 1881. He was born in Connecticut in 1837.

== Political career ==
Robertson was a state senator representing St. Landry Parish. During the 1876 presidential election, Robertson, a prominent supporter of Democratic nominee Samuel J. Tilden, was accused of offering a bribe of $200,000 to federal election officials to fraudulently deliver Louisiana's electoral votes for the Democrats.

Robertson was serving as President of the Senate when Governor Louis A. Wiltz died in 1881. Lieutenant Governor Samuel D. McEnery assumed the Governorship and Robertson became the Acting Lieutenant Governor. He was removed as President of the Senate and Acting Lieutenant Governor by a vote of that body on Dec. 24, 1881 and was replaced by Senator George L. Walton.

Robertson was not reelected to the Louisiana Senate in 1884.

He died at his home in 1889. He is buried in Metairie Cemetery.

Political offices
Preceded by Samuel D. McEnerny (D)	Lieutenant Governor of Louisiana; William A. Robertson (D) (Acting); October 16, 1881–December 24, 1881	Succeeded by George L. Walton (D)
