= Belisario Mattera =

Belisario Mattera was an Italian musician and mandolin virtuoso who is recorded as the first mandolinist to give instruction on his instrument (in 1873) to the Princess Princess Margherita of Savoy (Margherita Maria Teresa Giovanna; 20 November 1851 – 4 January 1926), was the Queen consort of the Kingdom of Italy during the reign (1878–1900) of her husband, Umberto of the Royal family of Italy. For a period of from ten to fifteen years in the nineteenth century the nobility and aristocracy of the country followed the example of their Sovereign, and the mandolin enjoyed great favour amongst the wealthy classes.

He was also the author of a mandolin method, Metodo per Mandolino del M-o Belisario Mattera scritto espressamente per Sua Altezza Reale La Principessa di Piemonte Napoli, (1861-1890) (Method for Mandolin by Belisario Mattera written expressly for Her Royal Highness The Princess of Piedmont, Napoli).

He was also made subject of a section of the biographical book Artisti Abruzzesi. Pittori scultori architetti maestri di musica fonditori cesellatori figuli, dagli antichi a’ moderni. Notizie e documenti, Napoli, De Angelis e figlio, tipografi, 1883 (Artists Abruzzo. Painters, sculptors, architects, engravers figuli smelters music teachers, from ancient to 'modern. Information and documents, Naples, De Angelis and son, printers, 1883). The book was by Vincent Bindi; Mattera is on page 170 of the book.
