= Jean-François Marmontel =

French historian and writer (1723–1799)

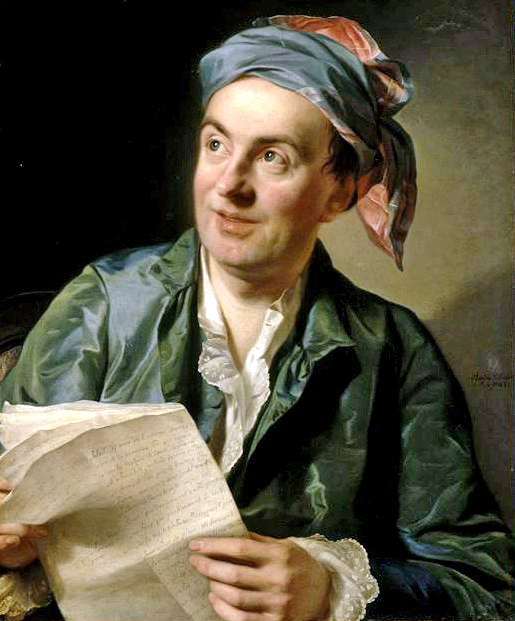
Portrait by Alexander Roslin (1767)

Jean-François Marmontel (French pronunciation: [ʒɑ̃ fʁɑ̃swa maʁmɔ̃tɛl]; 11 July 1723 – 31 December 1799) was a French historian, writer and a member of the Encyclopédistes movement.

== Biography ==
He was born of poor parents at Bort, Limousin (today in Corrèze). After studying with the Jesuits at Mauriac, Cantal, he taught in their colleges at Clermont-Ferrand and Toulouse; and in 1745, acting on the advice of Voltaire, he set out for Paris to try for literary success.

From 1748 to 1753 he wrote a succession of tragedies: Denys le Tyran (1748); Aristomene (1749); Cleopâtre (1750); Heraclides (1752); Egyptus (1753). These literary works, though only moderately successful on the stage, secured Marmontel's introduction into literary and fashionable circles.

He wrote a series of articles for the Encyclopédie evincing considerable critical power and insight, which in their collected form, under the title Eléments de Littérature, still rank among the French classics. He also wrote several comic operas, the two best of which probably are Sylvain (1770) and Zémire et Azore (1771). In the Gluck–Piccinni controversy he was an eager partisan of Piccinni with whom he collaborated in Roland (Piccinni) (1778) and Atys (1779), both using Jean Baptiste Lully's libretto by Quinault as basis, Didon (1783) and Penelope (1785).

In 1758 he gained the patronage of Madame de Pompadour, who obtained for him a place as a civil servant, and the management of the official journal Le Mercure, in which he had already begun the famous series of Contes moraux. The merit of these tales lies partly in the delicate finish of the style, but mainly in the graphic and charming pictures of French society under King Louis XV. The author was elected to the Académie Française in 1763. In 1767 he published Bélisaire, now remarkable in part because of a chapter on religious toleration which incurred the censure of the Sorbonne and the archbishop of Paris. Marmontel retorted in Les Incas, ou la destruction de l'empire du Perou (1777) by tracing the cruelties in Spanish America to the religious fanaticism of the invaders.

He was appointed historiographer of France (1771), secretary to the academy (1783), and professor of history in the Lycée (1786). As a historiographer, Marmontel wrote a history of the regency (1788). Reduced to poverty by the French Revolution, Marmontel retired during the Reign of Terror to Evreux, and soon afterwards to a cottage at Abloville (near Saint-Aubin-sur-Gaillon) in the département of Eure. There he wrote Memoires d'un père (4 vols., 1804), including a picturesque review of his life, a literary history of two important reigns, a great gallery of portraits extending from the venerable Jean Baptiste Massillon, whom more than half a century previously he had seen at Clermont, to Honoré Mirabeau. The book was nominally written for the instruction of his children. It contains an exquisite picture of his own childhood in the Limousin; its value for the literary historian is great.

Marmontel lived for some time under the roof of Madame Geoffrin, and was present at her famous dinners given to artists; he was welcomed into most of the houses where the encyclopaedists met, and was a contributor to the Encyclopédie ou Dictionnaire raisonné des sciences, des arts et des métiers. He thus had at his command the best material for his portraits, and made good use of his opportunities. After a short stay in Paris when elected in 1797 to the Conseil des Anciens, he died at Abloville.

He was a member of the Masonic lodge Les Neuf Sœurs.

John Ruskin named him as one of the three people in history who were the most influential for him. In his autobiography, John Stuart Mill credits Mémoires d'un père with curing him of depression.

== Works ==
=== Theatre ===
Marmontel published many opera librettos, mostly for operas comiques.

- 1748: Denys le tyran, tragedy, 5 February
- 1749: Aristomène, tragedy, 30 April
- 1750: Cléopâtre, tragédie, 20 May
- 1751: La Guirlande, acte de ballet, music by Jean-Philippe Rameau
- 1751: Acante et Céphise, pastorale héroïque in three acts, music by Jean-Philippe Rameau
- 1752: Les Héraclides, tragedy, 24 May
- 1753: Égyptus, tragedy
- 1753: Lisis et Délie, pastorale héroïque in 1 act, music by Jean-Philippe Rameau
- 1753: Les sibarites, acte de ballet, music by Jean-Philippe Rameau
- 1761: Hercule mourant, tragédie lyrique, music by Antoine Dauvergne
- 1762: Annette et Lubin
- 1766: La Bergère des Alpes
- 1768: Le Huron, opera comique, music by André Grétry
- 1769: Lucile, opéra comique, music by André Grétry
- 1770: Sylvain, opéra comique, music by André Grétry
- 1771: L'amie de la maison, opéra comique, music by André Grétry
- 1771: Zémire et Azor, opéra comique, music by André Grétry
- 1773: Céphale et Procris, ballet héroïque, music by André Grétry
- 1775: La Fausse magie, opéra comique, music by André Grétry
- 1783: Didon, opera, music by Niccolò Piccinni
- 1785: Pénélope, opéra comique, music by Niccolò Piccinni
- 1788: Démophoon, music by Luigi Cherubini.

=== Poetry ===
- Polymnie, satire en 11 chants
- 1751: L’établissement de l’École militaire,
- 1752: Vers sur la convalescence du Dauphin,
- 1753: La naissance du duc d’Aquitaine,
- 1760: Épître aux poètes,
- 1820: La Neuvaine de Cythère, (licencious poem)

=== Novels ===
- 1755–1759: Contes moraux,
- 1767: Bélisaire, Reprinted in 1787 by the Bibliothèque amusante. (see the two paintings by Jacques Louis David Bélisaire demandant l'aumône)
- 1777: Les Incas, ou la destruction de l'empire du Perou
- 1792: Nouveaux contes moraux

=== Essays ===
- 1763: Poétique française, 3 parts: a work in which Racine and Boileau are strongly attacked.
- 1777: Essai sur les révolutions de la musique en France,
- 1785: De l’Autorité de l’usage sur la langue,
- 1787: Éléments de littérature. Modern edition at Desjonquères, presented, established and annotated by Sophie Le Ménahèze, 2005.
- 1788: Mémoire sur la régence du duc d’Orléans
- 1792: Apologie de l’Académie française.

=== Varia ===
- 1746: L'Observateur littéraire : literary journal established with Jean-Grégoire Bauvin (or Beauvin); « Cette feuille, écrira-t-il, n'étant ni la critique infidèle et injuste des bons ouvrages, ni la satire amère et mordante des bons auteurs, elle eut peu de débit.» . The title was revived by abbé de La Porte in 1758.
- 1712–1714: The Rape of the Lock by Alexander Pope, translated into verse La boucle de cheveux enlevée, 1746. Edition bilingue moderne chez Rivages poche, 2010, 142 pages (ISBN 9782743621377)
- 1759: édition remaniée de Venceslas by Rotrou,
- 1766: La Pharsale de Lucain, translated into prose,
- 1775: édition des Chefs d’œuvres dramatiques de Mairet, Du Ryer et Rotrou, with a Commentaire,
- 1800: Mémoires d’un père pour servir à l’instruction de ses enfants,
- 1806: Leçons d’un père à ses enfants sur la langue française.
