= George L. Walton =

American politician

George L. Walton (1850–1941) was the president of the Louisiana State Senate and acting lieutenant governor of Louisiana from 1881 to 1884 serving under Governor Samuel D. McEnery.

During the American Civil War, Walton served as the captain of Company E of the 16th and 25th Consolidated Regiments of Louisiana Infantry from January 8, 1864, until the end of the war in the spring of 1865. He served as Democratic state senator representing Concordia Parish from 1880 to 1884.

When Governor Louis A. Wiltz died in 1881, Lieutenant Governor Samuel D. McEnery assumed the governorship and Senate President pro tempore William Robertson became the acting lieutenant governor. Robertson was removed as president pro tempore of the Senate and acting lieutenant governor by a vote of that body on December 24, 1881. He was replaced by Walton. who served out the remainder of McEnery's term.

In 1884, Walton announced his support for Republican presidential candidate James G. Blaine and switched parties. He was then nominated for an at-large congressional seat on the Republican ticket. He also ran for Congress for the Louisiana's 5th congressional district on the Greenback-Labor ticket that same year. Walton was unsuccessful in both contests.

Walton married Amanda Miller in 1855.

Political offices
Preceded by William A. Robertson (D) (Acting)	Lieutenant Governor of Louisiana; George L. Walton (D) (Acting); December 24, 1881–1884	Succeeded by Clay Knobloch (D)
