= Giuseppe Bellisario =

Italian painter (1821–1896)

Giuseppe Bellisario (June 15, 1821 – 1896) was an Italian painter.

== Biography ==
Bellisario was born in Naples, where he studied at the Institute of Fine Arts, under the mentorship of Francesco Oliva. He graduated with a pension of six ducats per month. At the Academy, he won a number of prizes.

At public exhibitions, he was often given a silver medal; in 1848, he was awarded a gold medal. In 1851, he was named professor of design at the Educandato Regina Coeli di Napoli; in 1860, he began teaching at the Institute of Fine Arts of Naples.

Bellisario was prolific, painting may portraits and producing many pictures and copies of sacred subjects. Described as a fervent Catholic, among his religious pictures are: The Prodigal Son; John the Baptist in the Desert; The Virgin of the Rosary; two Holy Family paintings; two Addolorate; a Deposition; The Apocalypse of St John; the Dream of Baby Jesus; The head of St John presented to Delilah; Saint Filomena; The Feeding of Baby Jesus; three St Louis Gonzaga paintings; The Martyrdom of St Bartholemew; St Francis of Assisi; St Jerome; The Divine Shepherdess; and Christ on the Cross

Among his other works are Francesca da Rimini; La Regina Giovanna col suo drudo; The Challenge of Barletta; Isabella Orsini; Famine in Naples; The Massacre of the Naples Police in 1860; Markos Botsaris; Aristide e il Pastore (Aristides of Athens); and Bacchus.

One of his pupils was Leonardo De Mango.
