= Belisario Albán Mestanza =

Ecuadorian lawyer

- Born: c. 1853; Quito, Ecuador
- Died: August 14, 1925 (aged 71–72)

Belisario Albán Mestanza (c. 1853 – 14 August 1925) was an Ecuadorian lawyer who played a notable role in the Liberal Revolution of Guayaquil, helping bring freedom of speech and other great changes, defending secularism.

"just as out of nowhere, this admirable way we call the universe stood out, and the dark sign of our degradation and shame has come forth."

== Life ==
1853 in Belisario was born about 1853 in Quito, Ecuador to José María Albán Calderón and Carmen Mestanza Enriquez. Growing up he studied in San Agustín school and San Gabriel School of Jesuit parents, graduating in 1853. He began his Jurisprudence career at the Central University, guided by his uncle, lawyer, and politician Mariano Mestanza, giving Belisario his library upon his death in 1875.

=== Life Events ===
- 1879 Graduated as a lawyer from Central University
- 1880 Alternate Councilor of the Quito Canton.
- 1884 Professor in the Faculty of Jurisprudence
- 1888 Among the founders of the 'Diario de Avisos "of Guayaquil
- 1889 Joined Republican Liberal Society
- 1895 A part of the Liberal Revolution of Guayaquil demonstration in Quito, organized revolts in nearby provinces. Released illustrious Roberto Andrade and several other political prisoners. Ceased the members of the Courts and Courts of Justice, suspending all trials until Alfaro reorganized the judiciary. Became Civil and Military chief, proclaimed freedom of speech and abolished censures. Held a chair in the reorganized Central University. Appointed Governor of the Province of Pichinch.
- 1896 Elected Deputy by Pichincha to the National Constituent Assembly. Resurrected his cabinet, and appointed Rafael Gómez de la Torre in the Interior, Ignacio Robles Santistevan in the Treasury and Isidro Suárez in the Treasury in the Ministry of Foreign Affairs and Worship. He went on to go against the church working towards separating church and state.
- 1899 Appointed Minister Justice of the Supreme Court of Justice until 1906
- 1902 Married Natalia Cabs
- 1907 Divorced Natalia Cabs
- 1906 Supported Alfaro's revolution against President Lizardo García
- 1907 Iccupied the Ministry of Interior (Government)
- Post-Alfaro (date unknown) suffered imprisonment and then retired
- 1920 Returned to the supreme court
- 1925 - died on August 14 due to heart disease

== Resources ==
- http://biblioteca.culturaypatrimonio.gob.ec/cgi-bin/koha/opac-search.pl?q=au:Alb%C3%A1n%20Mestanza,%20Belisario
- https://www.cancilleria.gob.ec/galeria-de-cancilleres/
