= Belisario (surname) =

Belisario is an Italian and Spanish surname. Notable people with the surname include:

- Isaac Mendes Belisario (1795–1849), Jamaican artist of Jewish descent
- John Belisario (1820–1900), Australian dental surgeon
- Manuel Belisario Moreno (d. 1917), Ecuadorian writer and priest
- Miriam Mendes Belisario (1816–1885), English Jewish writer and educator
- Ronald Belisario (born 1982), Venezuelan baseball pitcher

== See also ==
- Belisario (given name)
- Bellisario, an Italian surname
