= Bélisaire =

1767 novel by Jean-François Marmontel

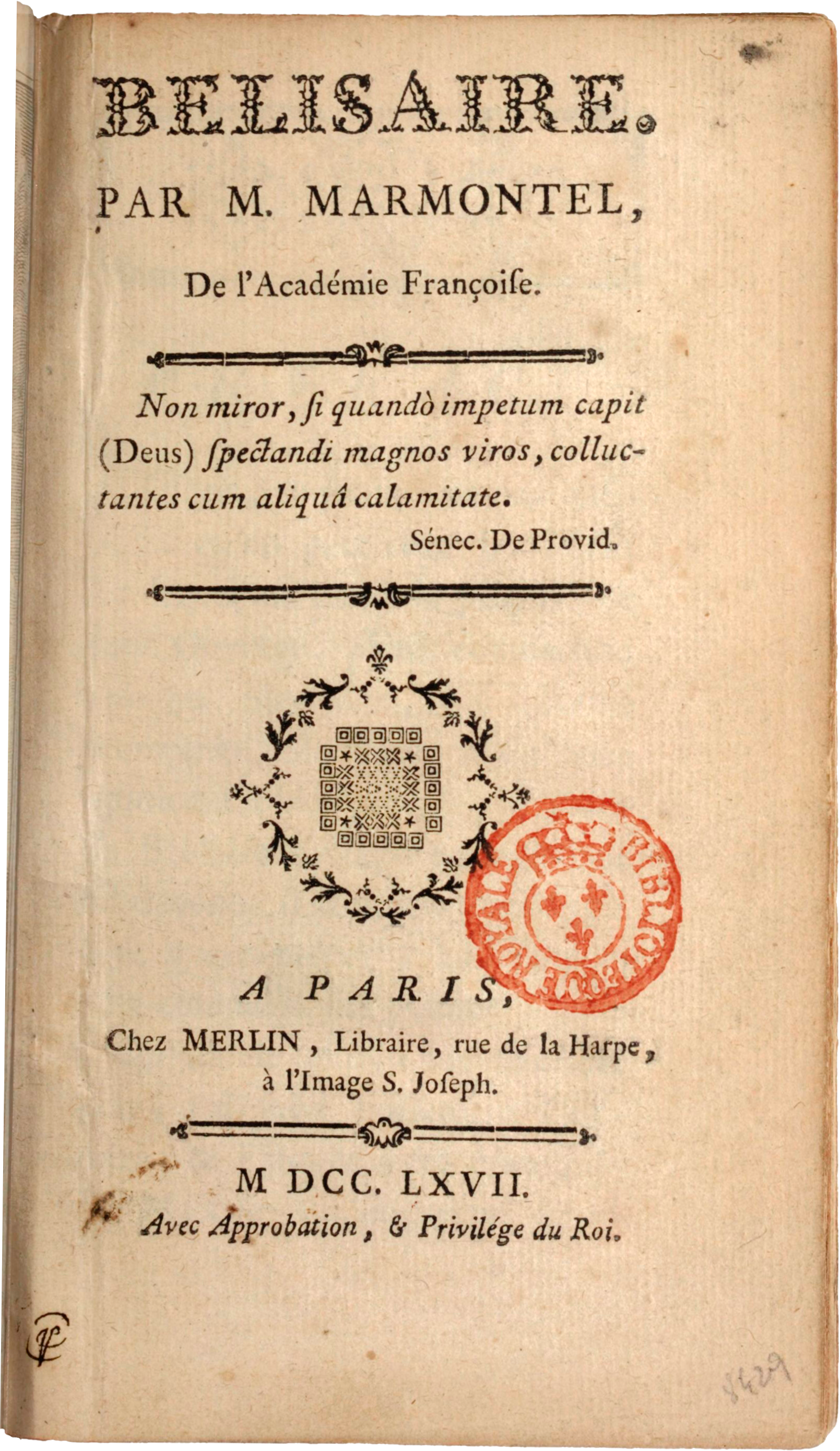
- Title page of the first edition
- Author: Jean-François Marmontel
- Language: French
- Genre: Historical fiction
- Publication date: 1767
- Publication place: France

Bélisaire is a banned 1767 French novel on the life of the Byzantine general Belisarius by Jean-François Marmontel. It popularised the apocryphal tale of his being reduced to beggary by Justinian I despite his great services to the empire, citing it as an example of the ingratitude of those in power towards their faithful servants and indicting the French king Louis XV by proxy as another such ungrateful monarch.
