= Portrait of Madame X =

1884 painting by John Singer Sargent

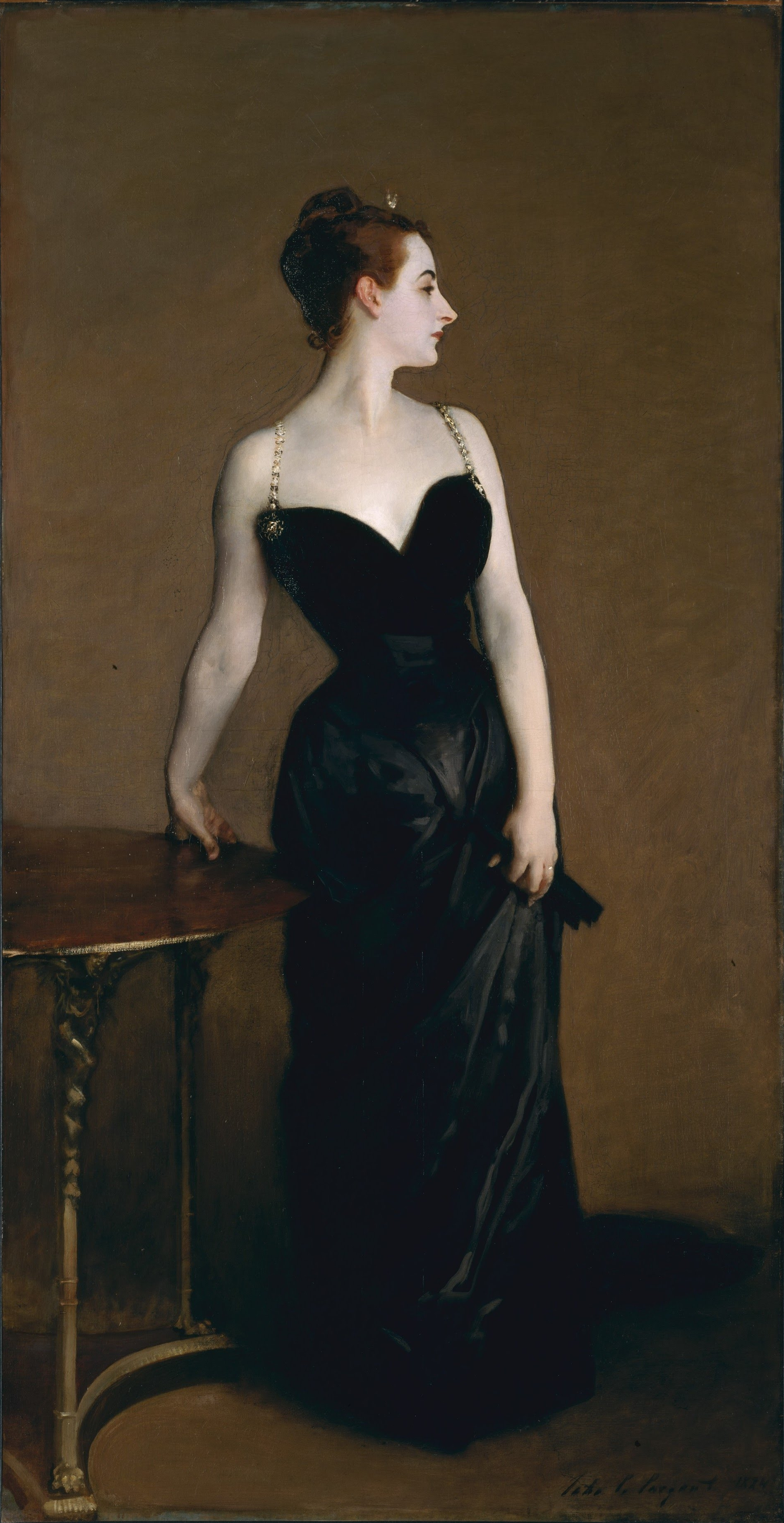
- Artist: John Singer Sargent
- Year: 1884
- Medium: Oil on canvas
- Dimensions: 234.95 cm × 109.86 cm (92.5 in × 43.25 in)
- Location: Metropolitan Museum of Art, Manhattan
- Website: Madame X (Madame Pierre Gautreau)

Madame X or Portrait of Madame X is an 1884 portrait painting by John Singer Sargent of a young socialite, Virginie Amélie Avegno Gautreau, wife of the French banker Pierre Gautreau. Madame X was painted not as a commission, but at the request of Sargent. It is a study in opposition. Sargent shows a woman posing in a black satin dress with jeweled straps, a dress that reveals and hides at the same time. The portrait is characterized by the pale flesh tone of the subject contrasted against a dark-colored dress and background. The dress was originally painted with one of the straps hanging off her shoulder, but after a negative response from viewers he repainted it to secure it over her shoulder.

The scandal resulting from the painting's controversial reception at the Paris Salon of 1884 (negative reviews saw it as vulgar and over-sexualized, (Note: Originally, the right strap of her dress was painted as slipped down her shoulder, but after the Salon show, Sargent repainted the strap firmly upright.) or criticized the stark contrast) amounted to a temporary setback to Sargent while in France, though it may have helped him later establish a successful career in Britain and America. According to the Musée d'Orsay, it is now regarded as the "Mona Lisa of the American art collection conserved by the Metropolitan Museum of Art".

== Background ==
Virginie Gautreau was an American French creole who emigrated from New Orleans to Paris where she married a French banker twice her age. She became rather notorious in Parisian high society for her beauty and rumored sexual infidelities. She wore lavender powder and prided herself on her appearance. She was referred to as a "professional beauty" – a term for a woman who uses personal skills to advance herself socially. Her unconventional beauty made her an object of fascination for artists; the American painter Edward Simmons claimed that he "could not stop stalking her as one does a deer." Sargent was also impressed, and anticipated that a portrait of Gautreau would garner much attention at the upcoming Paris Salon, and increase interest in portrait commissions. He wrote to a friend:

I have a great desire to paint her portrait and have reason to think she would allow it and is waiting for someone to propose this homage to her beauty. If you are 'bien avec elle' and will see her in Paris, you might tell her I am a man of prodigious talent.

Although she had refused numerous similar requests from painters, Gautreau accepted Sargent's offer in February 1883. Sargent was an expatriate like Gautreau, and their collaboration has been interpreted as motivated by a shared desire to attain higher status in French society.

== Studies ==
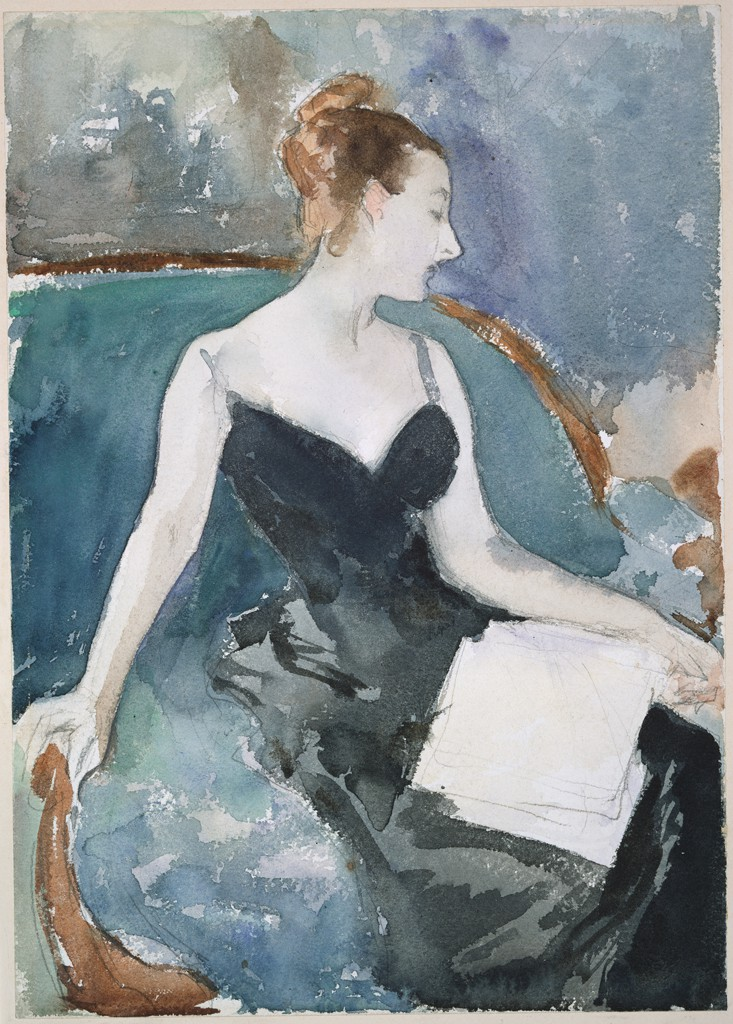
A figure study by Sargent in watercolor and graphite, c. 1883

Little progress was made during the winter of 1883, as Gautreau was distracted by social engagements, and was not by nature inclined to the discipline of sitting for a portrait. At her suggestion, Sargent traveled to her estate in Brittany in June, where he commenced a series of preparatory works in pencil, watercolors, and oils. About thirty drawings resulted from these sessions, in which many poses were attempted. Like the eventual portrait, an oil sketch entitled Madame Gautreau Drinking a Toast (Isabella Stewart Gardner Museum), shows the subject's profile and bare arms against a dark background, but is of a more freely brushed and informal character.

Just as she had been in Paris, in the country Gautreau was bored by the process of sitting; here, too, there were social engagements, as well as the responsibilities of tending to her four-year-old daughter, her mother, house guests, and a full domestic staff. Sargent complained of "the unpaintable beauty and hopeless laziness of Madame Gautreau."

== Execution ==
As in his previous entries to the Salon, The Daughters of Edward Darley Boit and El Jaleo, Sargent chose a canvas of dimensions large enough to ensure notice on the crowded Salon walls. The pose proved to be different from any of those tried in the preliminary works. Gautreau had to stand with her body facing the artist while her head was turned away, her right arm extended behind her for support, her hand on a low table; the result was to create tension in the neck and arm as well as to emphasize the subject's elegant contours. For painting the unusual tone of Gautreau's pale skin, Sargent used a palette composed of lead white, rose madder, vermilion, viridian, and bone black.

Even when composition had been decided upon and painting started, work progressed slowly. In a letter to a friend Sargent wrote "One day I was dissatisfied with it and dashed a tone of light rose over the former gloomy background ... The élancée [tall and slender] figure of the model shows to much greater advantage." On September 7, Sargent wrote "still at Paramé, basking in the sunshine of my beautiful model's countenance". By the fall, Sargent's interest in the venture was nearing completion, "The summer is definitely over and with it, I admit, is my pleasure at being at Les Chênes [Gautreau's estate]". While the work was in progress, Gautreau was enthusiastic; she believed that Sargent was painting a masterpiece.

== Description ==
There is an assertion and showiness in the expanse of white skin – from her high forehead to her graceful neck, shoulders, and arms. Although the black of her dress is bold, it is also deep, recessive and mysterious. She is surrounded by a rich brown which is at once luminous and dark enough to provide contrast to the skin tones. Most disconcerting is the whiteness of the skin, an overt contrivance of "aristocratic pallor"; by contrast her red ear is a reminder of the color of flesh unadorned.

Sargent chose the pose for Gautreau carefully: her body boldly faces forward while her head is turned in profile. A profile is both assertion and retreat; half of the face is hidden while, at the same time, the part that shows can seem more defined than full face.

The table provides support for Gautreau, and echoes her curves and stance. At the time, her pose was considered sexually suggestive. As originally exhibited, one strap of her gown had fallen down Gautreau's right shoulder, suggesting the possibility of further revelation; "One more struggle", wrote a critic in Le Figaro, "and the lady will be free".

The image's erotic suggestion is of a distinctly upper-class sort: unnaturally pale skin, cinched waist, severity of profile and an emphasis on aristocratic bone structure all imply a distant sexuality "under the professional control of the sitter", rather than offered for the viewer's delectation.

Classical sources, such as the figures in a fresco by Francesco de' Rossi, have been suggested as inspiration for the pose. The painting features several subtle classical references: sirens of Greek mythology adorn the table's legs, and the crescent tiara worn by Gautreau symbolizes the goddess Diana. The latter was not contrived by the artist, but was part of Gautreau's self-display.

== Reception ==
Immediate reactions to the painting were strongly negative. Sargent attended the opening of the Paris Salon's 1884 exhibition, at which Madame X (under the title Portrait de Mme ***) was first exhibited, along with Ralph Wormeley Curtis. Curtis wrote that "There was a grande tapage [mob] before it all day." While some artists praised Sargent's style, Curtis wrote that the general public reaction was overwhelmingly negative: "All the women jeer. Ah voilà 'la belle!' 'Oh quelle horreur!' [Ah, here is 'the beauty'!' 'Oh how horrible!'] etc."

Shortly after the exhibition's opening, negative reviews began pouring in. The first, in L'Événement (a French newspaper), read:

"Mr. Sargent made a mistake if he thinks he expressed the shattering beauty of his model ... . Even recognizing certain qualities that the painting has, we are shocked by the spineless expression and the vulgar character of the figure."

Similar reviews followed suit. Many focused on the perceived unattractiveness of the painting's subject, particularly in comparison to the reputation Gautreau (whose identity was only thinly veiled by the anonymity of the painting's title) had as a great beauty, and often focusing on her skin, which was described as "pallid" and "corpse-ish".

Others focused on the sexuality of the portrait. One critic for L'Artiste wrote, "Of all the undressed women at the Salon this year, the most interesting is Madame Gautreau ... because of the indecency of her dress that looks like it is about to fall off." The painting's standoffish promiscuity was lampooned. La Vie Parisienne published a caricature of Madame X, depicting Gautreau with her bosom exposed. The caption read: "Mélie, your dress is falling off!" "It's on purpose. ... And leave me alone anyway, won't you?"

Some reviews accused Sargent of trying to manufacture scandal, with a writer for Art Amateur calling Madame X "a wilful exaggeration of every one of his vicious eccentricities, simply for the purpose of being talked about and provoking argument."

A comparatively small number of positive reviews focused on the perceptions of future audiences, with one theorizing that "if it is true that each generation remakes in its own image the work of nature, then future critics will see here our Parisian cosmopolitanism manifested in ideal form."

== Aftermath ==
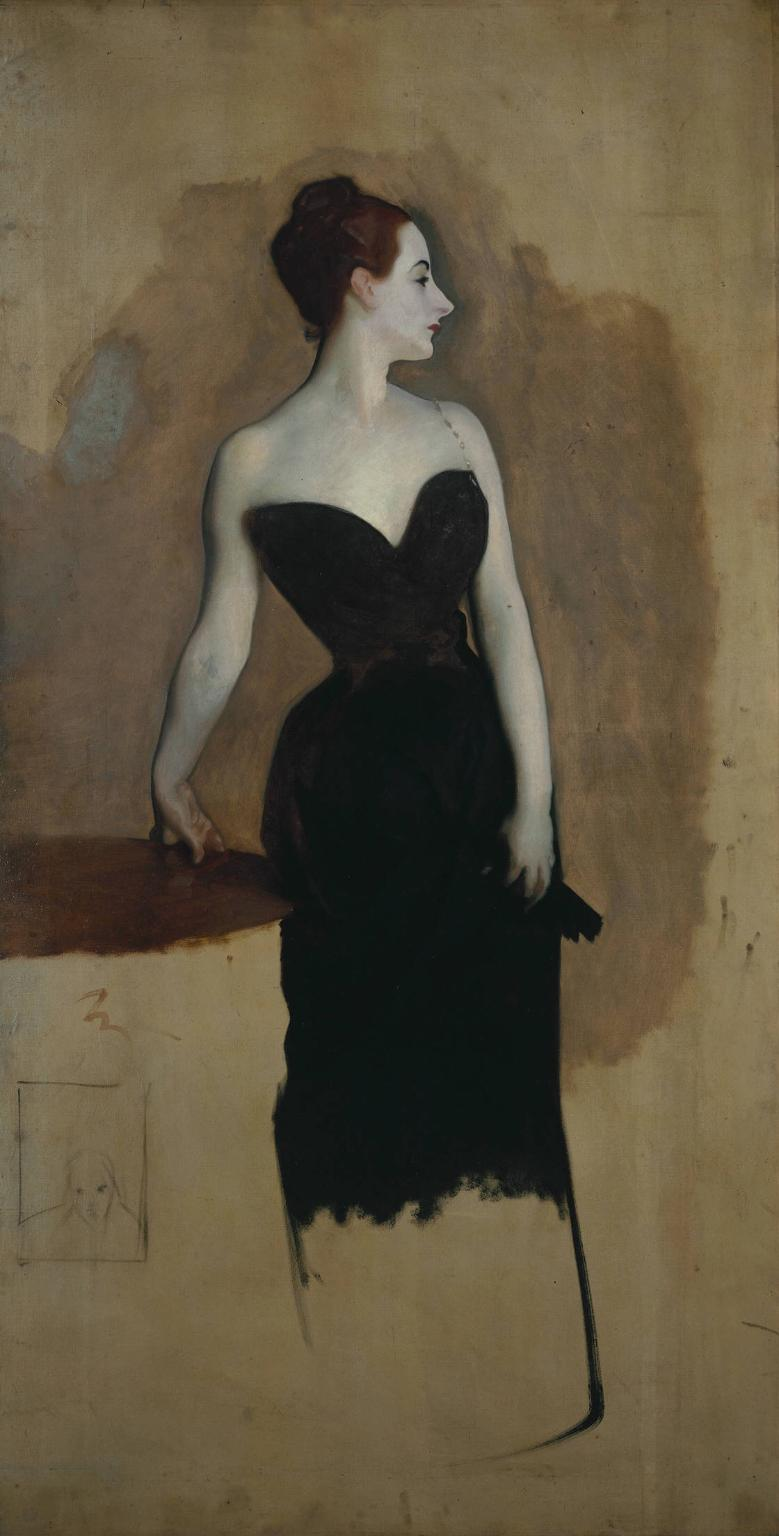
Unfinished study in Tate Gallery

Sargent was severely disappointed by the public reaction to Madame X. Ralph Curtis wrote of Sargent's reaction on the day of the exhibition's opening, "John, poor boy, was navré [heartbroken]." Gautreau, too, was distressed: "Mde. Gautreau and mère [mother] came to his studio 'bathed in tears.'" Gautreau's mother requested that Sargent withdraw the painting from the exhibition. Sargent refused, saying he had painted her "exactly as she was dressed, that nothing could be said of the canvas worse than had been said in print of her appearance". Later, Sargent overpainted the shoulder strap to raise it up and make it look more securely fastened. An unfinished version of the same pose, in which the position of the right shoulder strap remained unresolved, is in the Tate, London.

Sargent hung Madame X first in his Paris studio, and later in his studio in London. Starting in 1905, he displayed it in a number of international exhibitions.

Seven years after Sargent painted Madame Gautreau, Gustave Courtois painted her. As in the earlier painting, the portrait shows her face in profile. She wears the same style of dress, with Courtois's portrait showing a bit more skin. The strap of her dress hangs off her shoulder much as it had in Sargent's portrait. This time, however, the portrait was well received by the public. In 1897 Gautreau posed yet again for a standing portrait, for what would be her favorite version, by Antonio de La Gándara.

In 1916, Sargent sold the painting to the Metropolitan Museum of Art, writing to its director, "I suppose it is the best thing I have ever done." The art world's changing response to the portrait was noted by the New York Herald in its May 12, 1916, headline: "Sargent Masterpiece Rejected by Subject Now Acquired by Museum." In 1960, Cuban-American fashion designer Luis Estévez created a dress based on the dress depicted in Madame X. Dina Merrill modeled the Estévez dress for photographer Milton H. Greene published in Life magazine on January 11, 1960.

The 1980s saw a renewed interest in Sargent's work. Today, Portrait of Madame X is Sargent's best-known work.

Nicole Kidman was photographed in a similar dress and pose for Vogue magazine in 1999.

== Analysis ==
Art historians have used Madame X to examine the conventions, particularly regarding sexuality and dress, of the time period during which it was exhibited.

Concerning the black gown depicted in the portrait, dress historian Aileen Ribeiro writes that "The dress is so scandalous even an actress would have thought twice about wearing it for a portrait." Valerie Steele, a dress historian and the curator of the Museum at FIT, further contextualizes why contemporary audiences found Madame X's dress so shocking: "'Though the cuirass would have had some kind of lining to soak up sweat, the model would not have been wearing any underwear." Dress historian Justine De Young, however, argues that "it was not the dress itself that prompted criticism, but instead her way of wearing it (with the slipped shoulder strap and heavy make-up)."

Art historian Dorothy Moss analyzed contemporary reviews, positing that "The language of contemporary criticism reveals that it was [Sargent's] emphasis on the sitter's artifice that, above all, excited the critics." Art historian Elizabeth Renes explains that "Sargent uses two techniques in Madame X to bring focus to her 'whiteness' and her 'cosmetic exterior': the dark background, which creates a high contrast to further highlight her skin, and the uncomfortable, sculptural pose, paired with the simplicity of the gown, which forces more of her flesh into view." Naturalness was the ideal of beauty at the time, and Madame X "defiantly violated this cherished precept of nineteenth-century decorum."

Art historian Susan Sidlauskas lists "the brazenness of [Gautreau's] self-display; the singularity of her adornments, both sartorial and cosmetic; and the crudeness of her American ambitiousness" as "evident" reasons why audiences were offended by Madame X. Sidlauskas also argues that, on a subconscious level, "Gautreau aroused the anxieties of her audience" as her carefully-styled appearance rested in an uncanny valley between life and death. Sidlauskas particularly focuses on Gautreau's powdered skin, which audiences found unsettling. By inviting attention, but not necessarily attraction, "Gautreau – through Sargent – brazenly defied the conventions for feminine display, and in so doing spurned the visible signs of masculine possession."

Deborah Davis, author of Strapless: John Singer Sargent and the Fall of Madame X, notes that women were particularly vocal about their disapproval of Madame X, "as if to assert their moral superiority." Davis also explains that, while there were plenty of nude paintings exhibited alongside Madame X, none of which were the subject of scandal, "nude women in paintings could be only historical or mythological figures, or anonymous types." While Gautreau's identity was technically obscured in the title, it was widely known. Because Gautreau was a public figure and a married woman, her suggestive appearance was more shocking than works which were "mindful of the conventions regarding nudes".

== Gallery ==
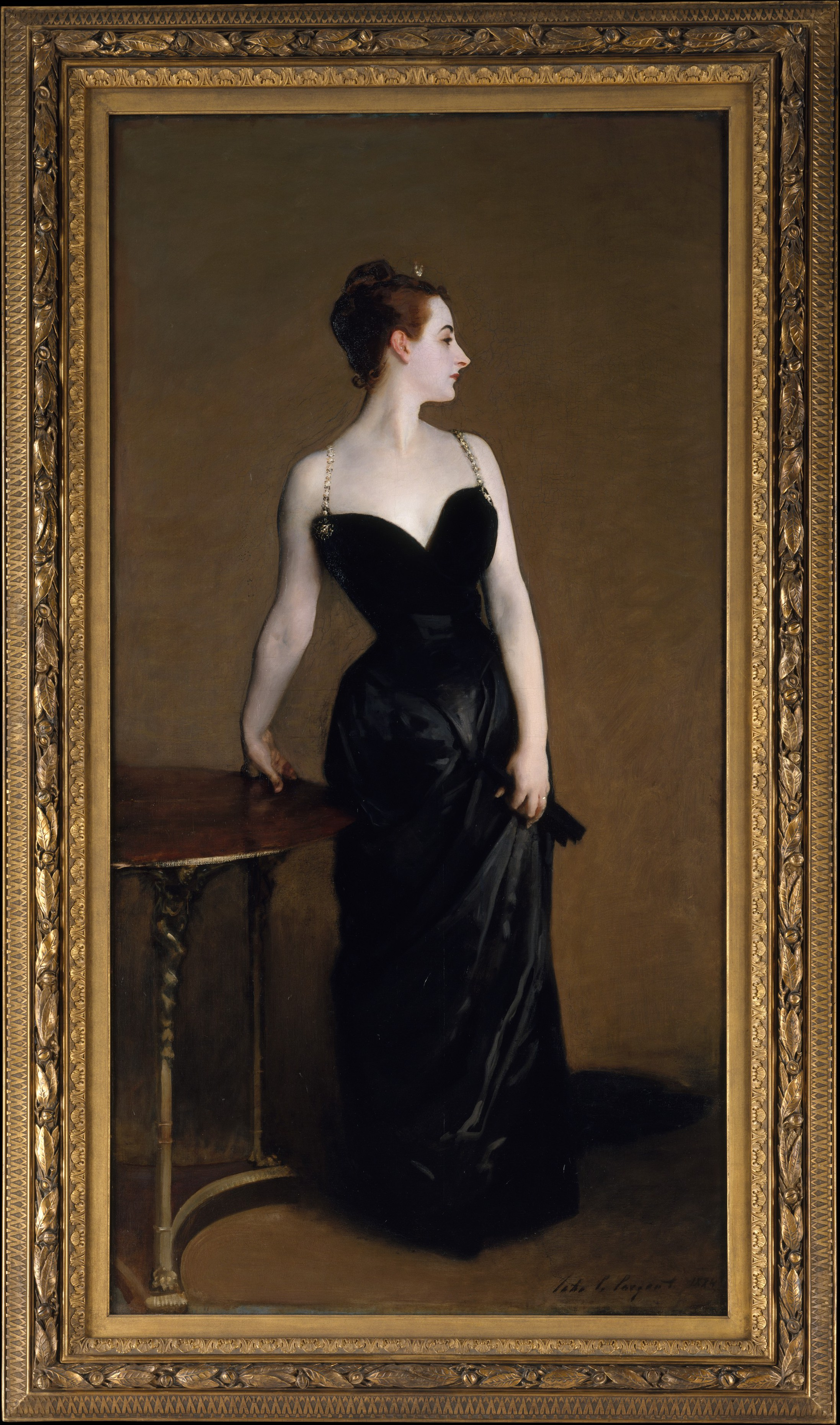
On display in the Metropolitan Museum of Art

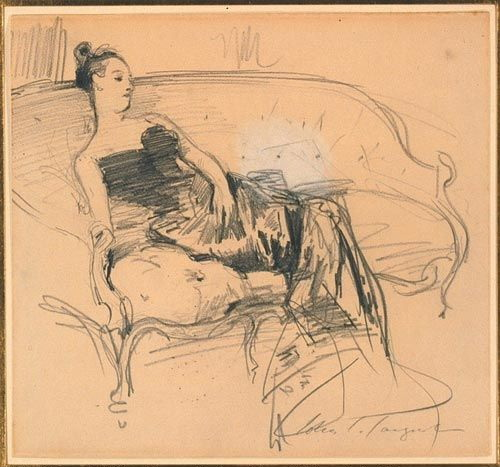
Study for Madame X, on couch

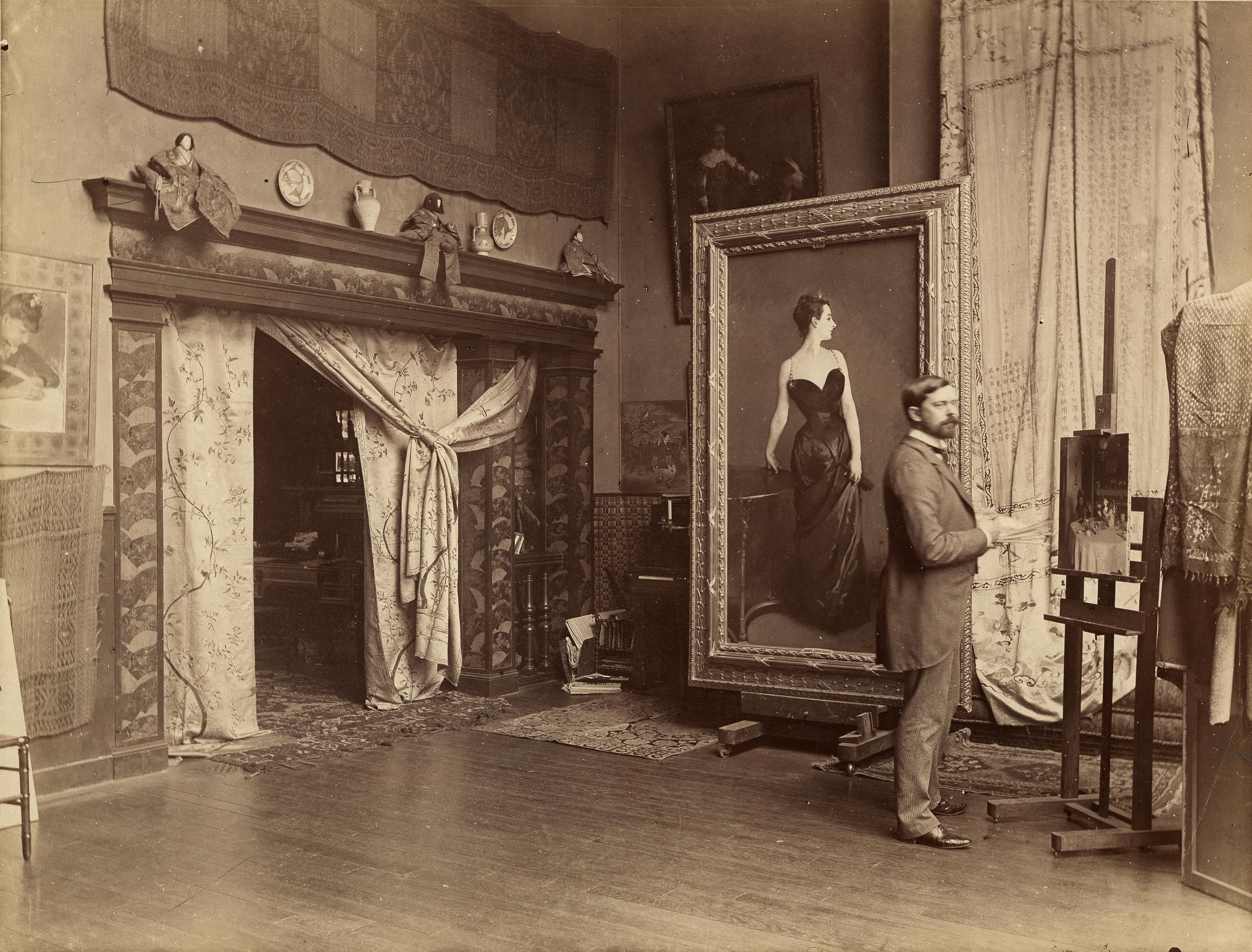
Sargent in his Paris studio, ca. 1885

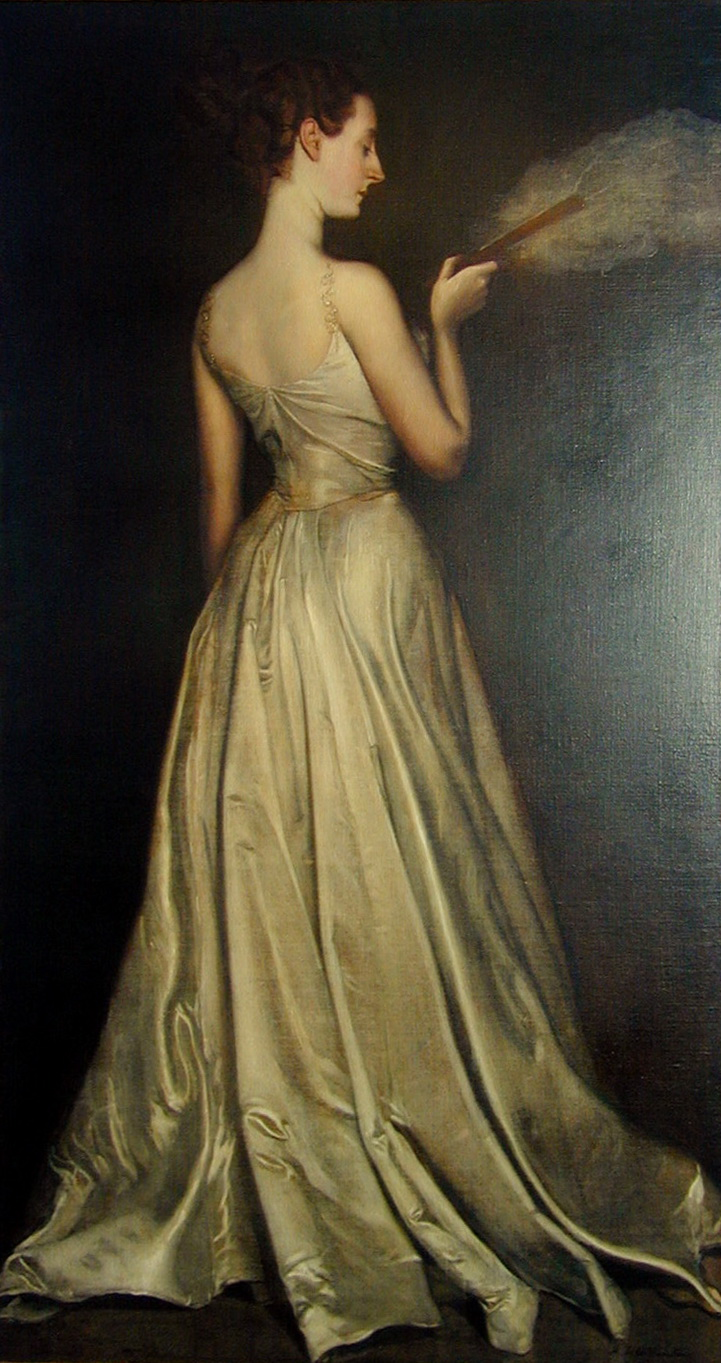
Antonio de La Gándara, Madame Pierre Gautreau, 1898

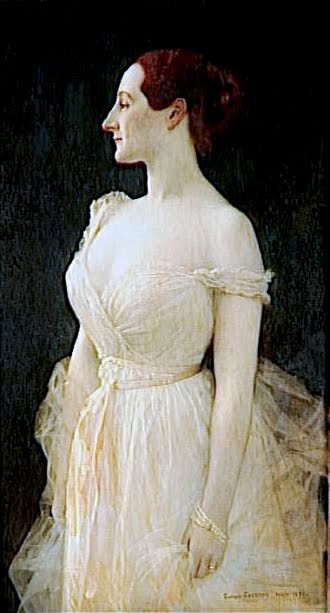
Gustave Courtois, Madame Gautreau, 1891

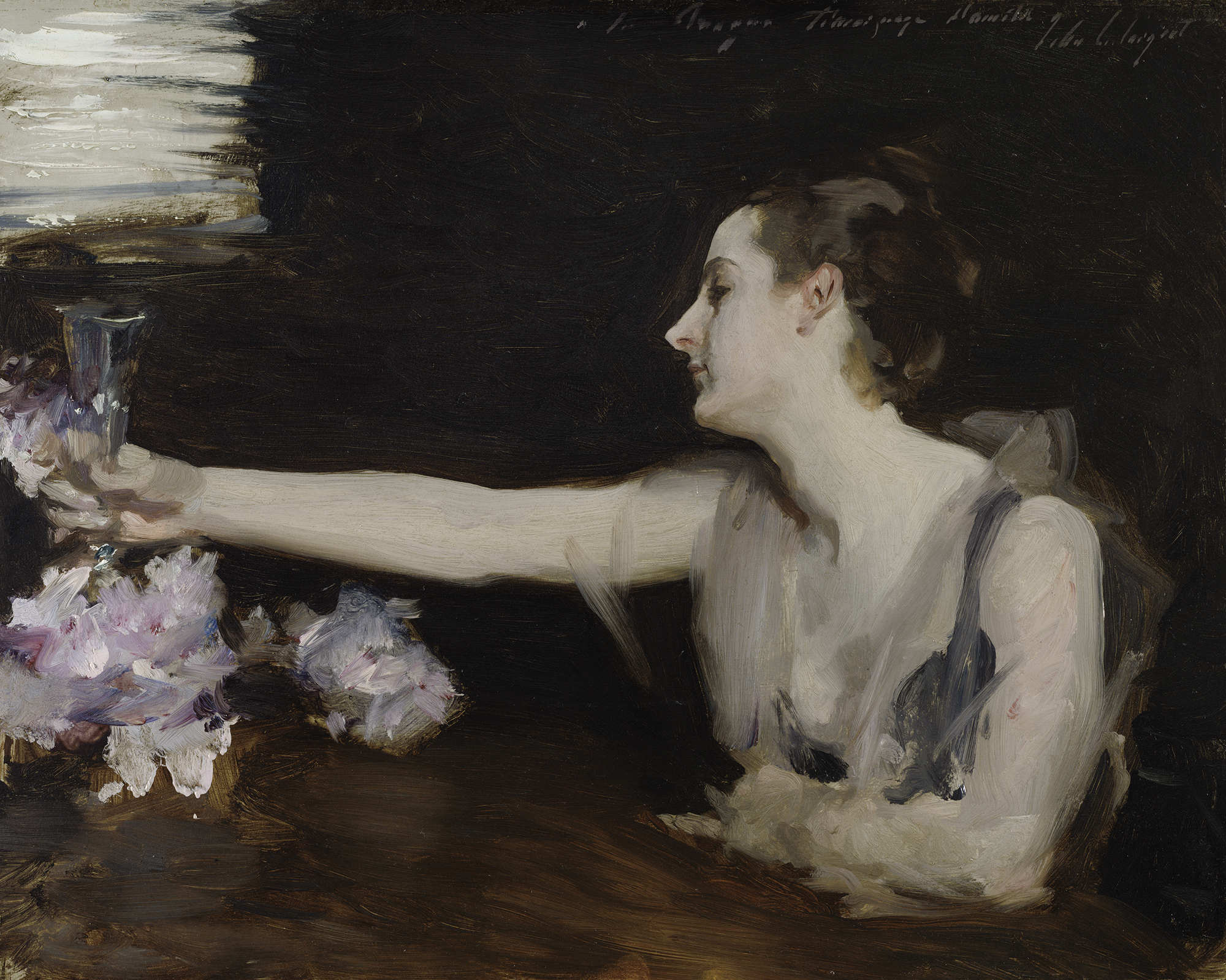
Madame Gautreau Drinking a Toast, c. 1882–83

== See also ==
- List of works by John Singer Sargent
- Portrait of Madam X, 1889 portrait painting by Halil Pasha
