= Portrait of Madam X =

Painting by Halil Pasha

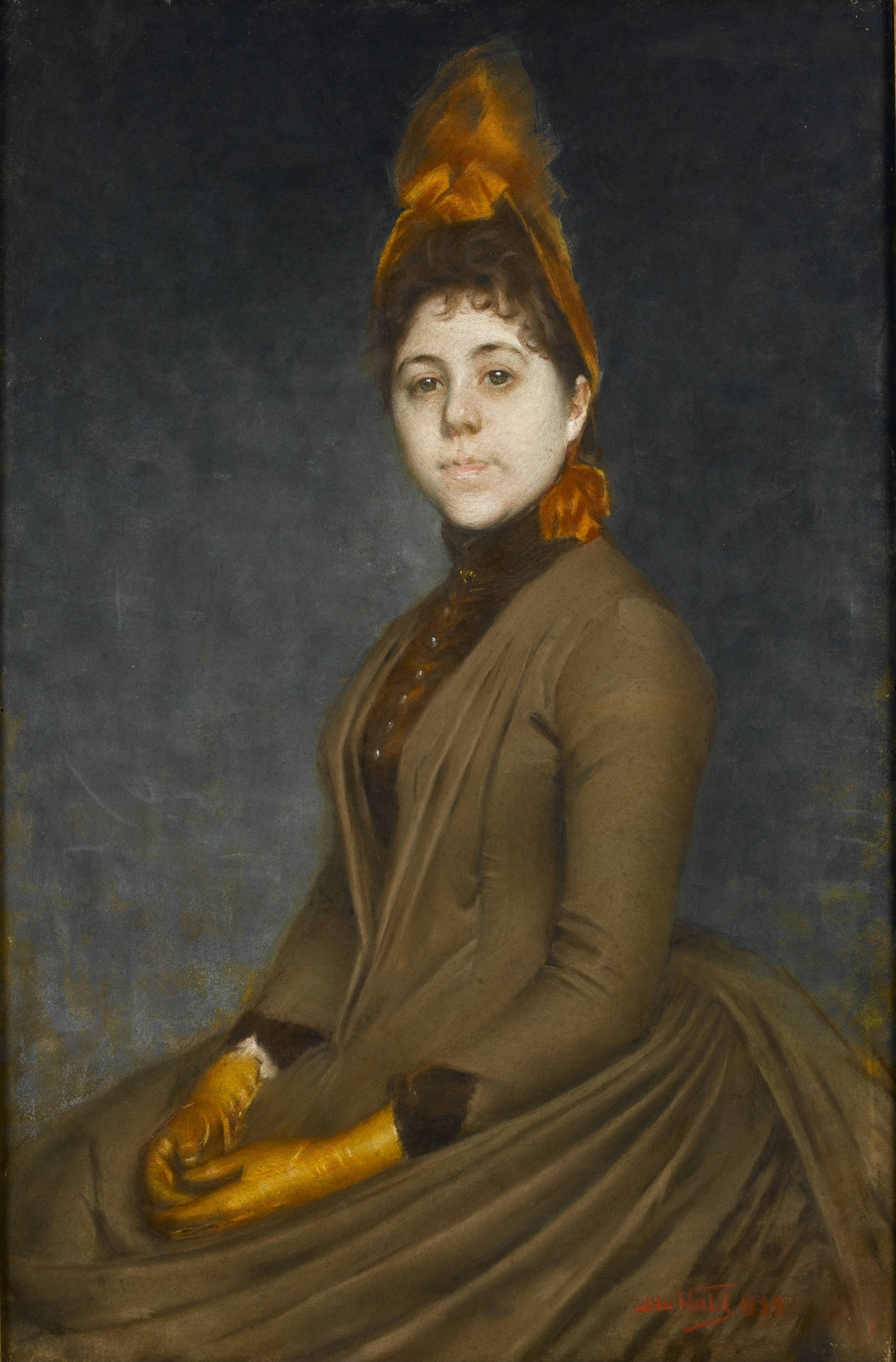
- Artist: Halil Pasha
- Year: 1889
- Medium: Oil and pastels on cardboard
- Subject: Wife of the painter, Aliye Hanım or a Parisian woman
- Dimensions: 65 cm × 100.5 cm (26 in × 39.6 in)
- Location: Sakıp Sabancı Museum; Istanbul

Madam X is an 1889 portrait painting by Halil Pasha of either his wife, Aliye Hanım, or a Parisian woman.

It is a portrait of a brown-clad woman sitting in front of a dark navy blue background, hands clasped in her lap. The woman's body (turned to her right), is turned to the left in the painting, with her face facing the viewer. Her face is white, her hair brown, and her eyes dark blue. Madam X's gaze is the most impressive element of the work. Oil paints and pastels were used on cardboard to form this work.

The subject of the painting is unknown, but it is thought to be the painter's wife, Aliye Hanım, or a Parisian woman. The painter, Halil Pasha, participated in the Paris National Exhibition, held for the 100th Anniversary of the French Revolution in 1889 with this work, and received a bronze medal. At an auction held on June 1, 2008, this work was bought for $206,612.

The painting is currently held at the Sakıp Sabancı Museum.
