= Halil Pasha (painter) =

Ottoman painter (1857–1939)

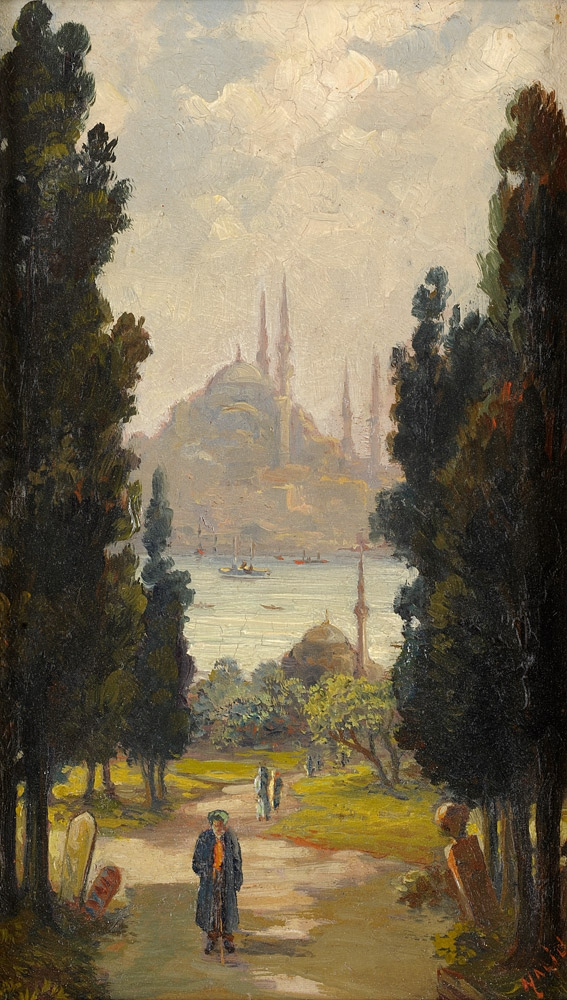
View of Istanbul (c. 1900)

Halil Pasha (c. 1857, Istanbul - August 1939, Istanbul) was a Turkish painter and art teacher. He was one of Turkey's first Impressionists.

== Biography ==
His family was originally from Rhodes and his father, Selim, was one of the founders of the Turkish Military Academy.

Like many early Western-style Turkish artists, he received his training in technical drawing and painting at the "Mühendishane-i Berrî-i Hümâyûn" (Military School of Engineering), now known as the Istanbul Technical University. Upon graduating, students were normally commissioned to become teachers at military schools, but he insisted on being allowed to continue his studies in Paris. In 1880, his father finally agreed, and he spent eight years working in the studios of Jean-Léon Gérôme. He had his first showing at the Exposition Universelle in 1889 and won a medal. As it turned out, when he went back to Turkey, he still became a teacher at a military school.

In 1906, he was granted the title "Pasha". Two years later, however, at the beginning of the Second Constitutional Era, he chose to retire with the rank of Colonel and become a private art teacher. Later, he taught at the "Sanayi-i Nefise Mekteb-i Alisi" (School of Fine Arts and Crafts), now the Mimar Sinan Fine Arts University and served as its Director from 1917 to 1918. His students included Müfide Kadri, who became Turkey's first female art teacher.

During the Turkish War of Independence, he went to Egypt at the invitation of Abbās Ḥilmī Pasha, the former (and last) Khedive. Later, he was a long-term guest at the Khedive's largely unused mansion in Istanbul and had a studio there.

== Selected paintings ==
From the Sakıp Sabancı Museum, Istanbul
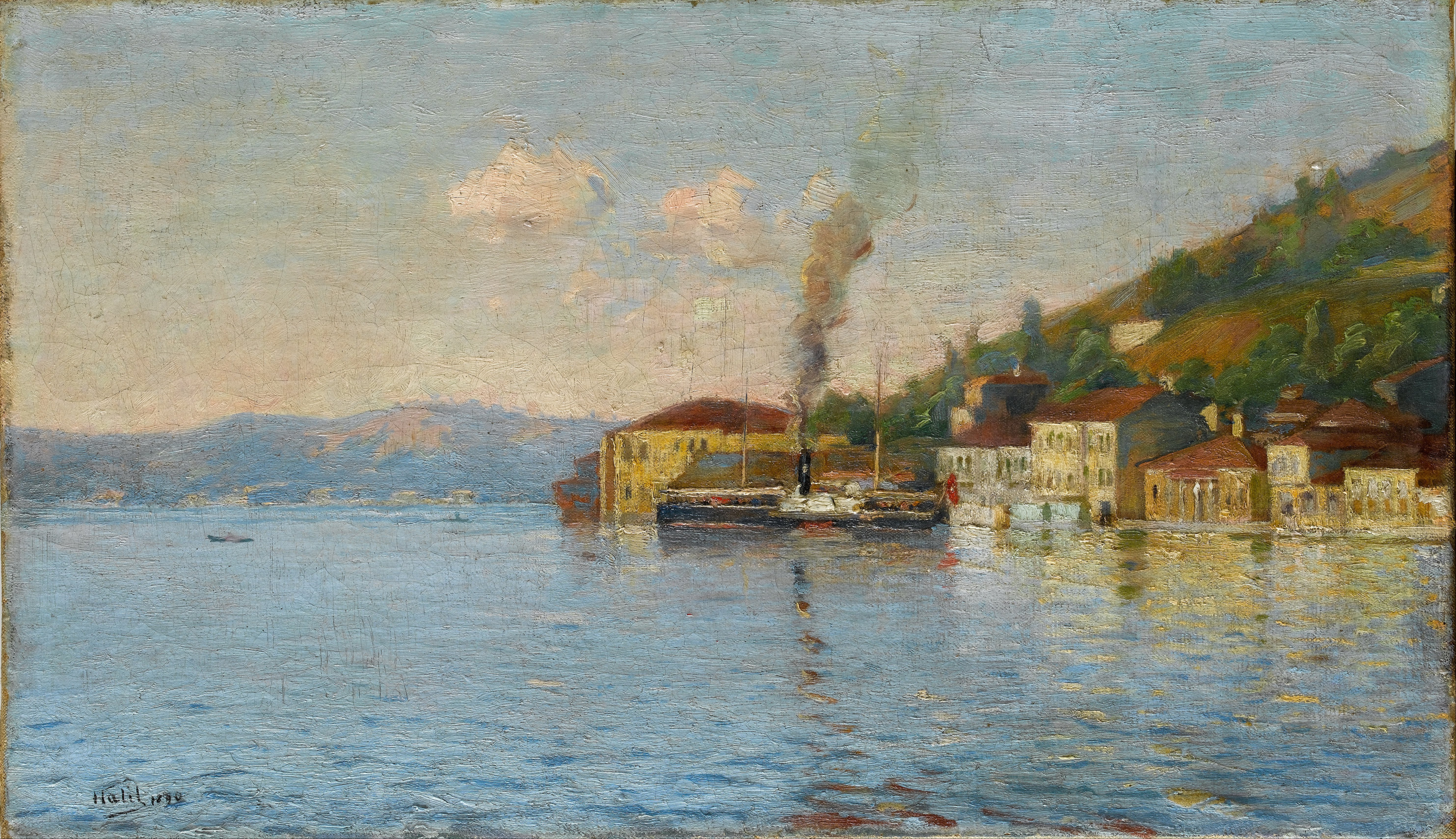
Çengelköy Ferry Quay on the Bosphorus (1890)

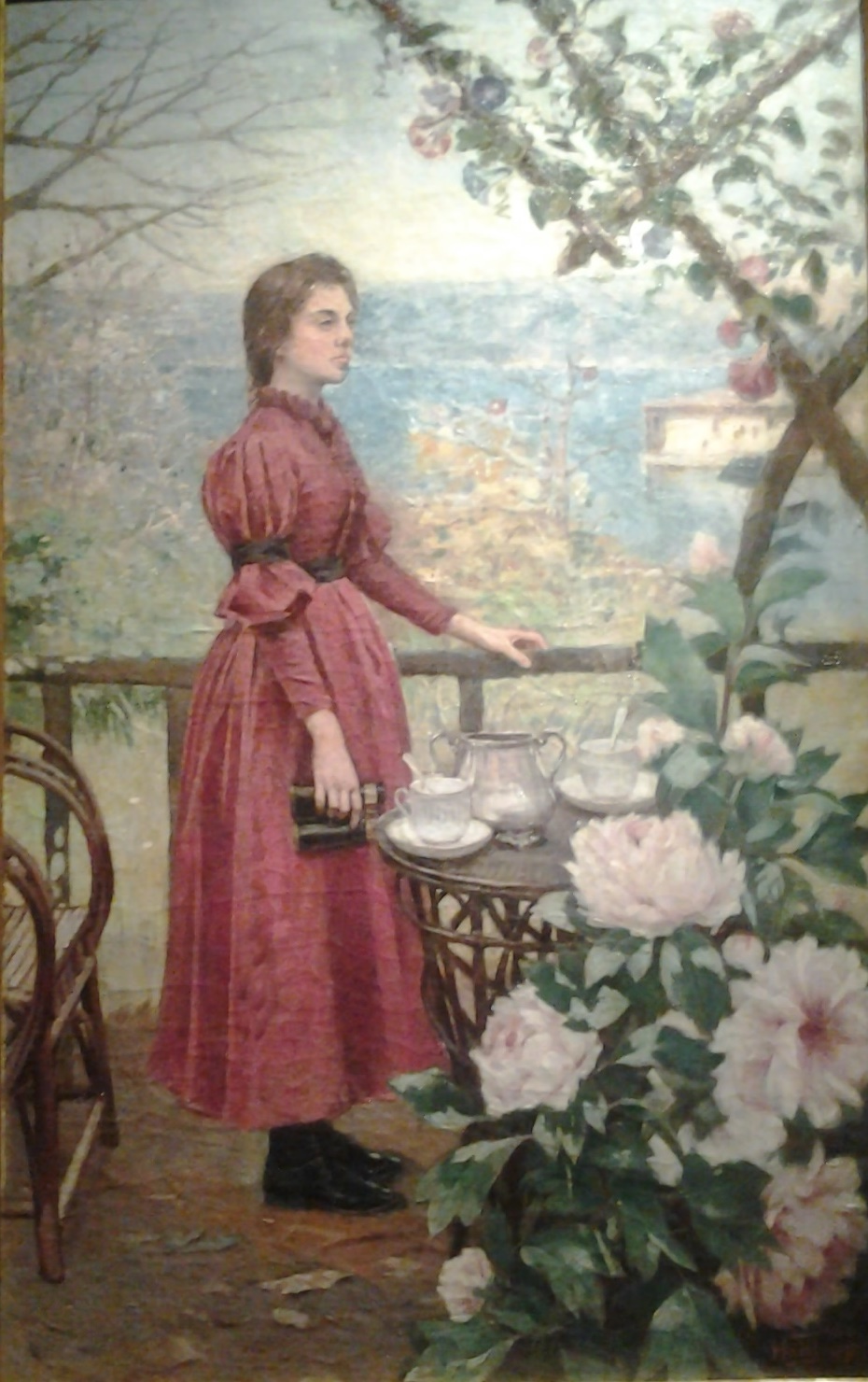
Woman with Peonies (1898)

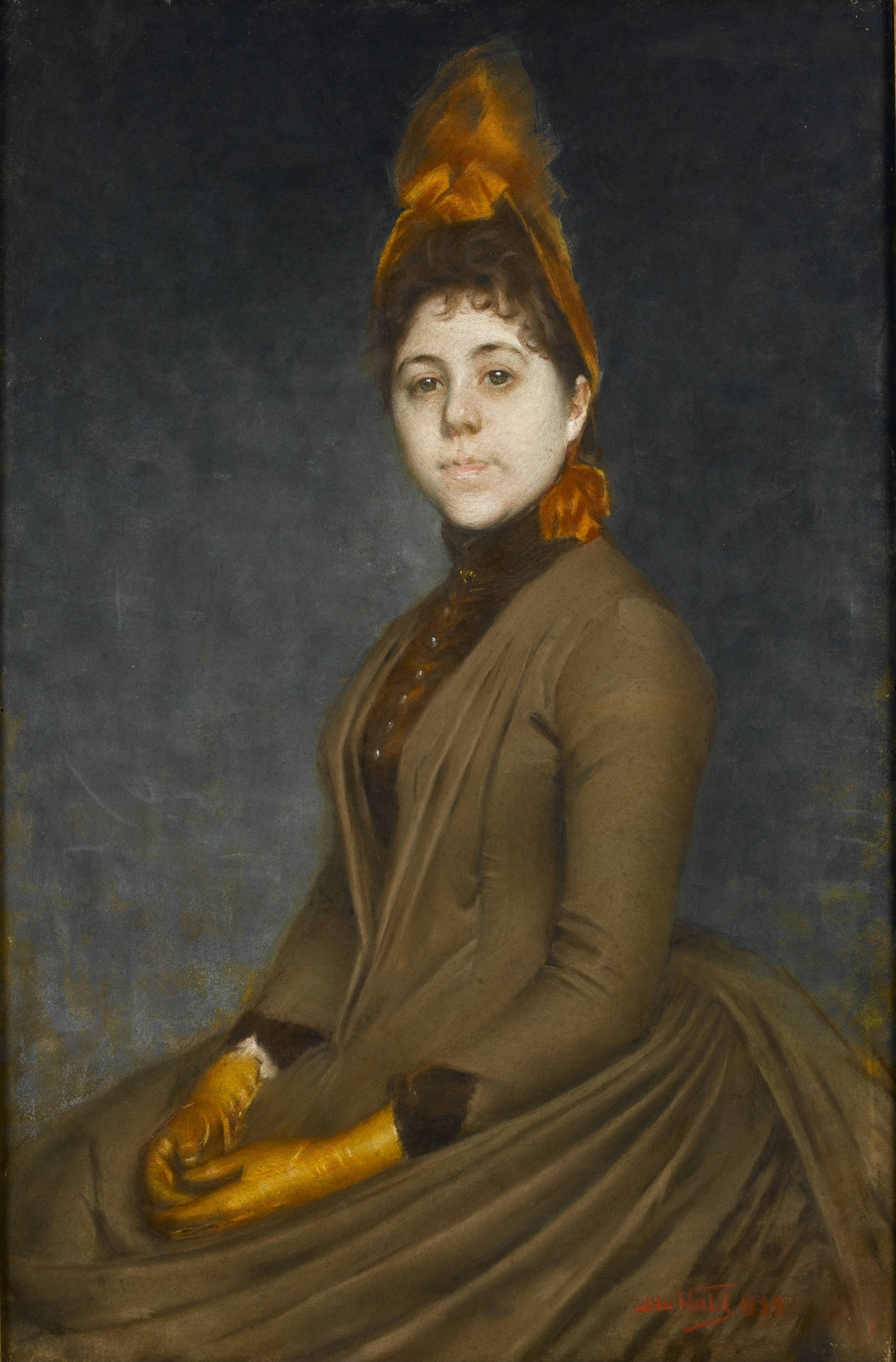
Madam X (1899)

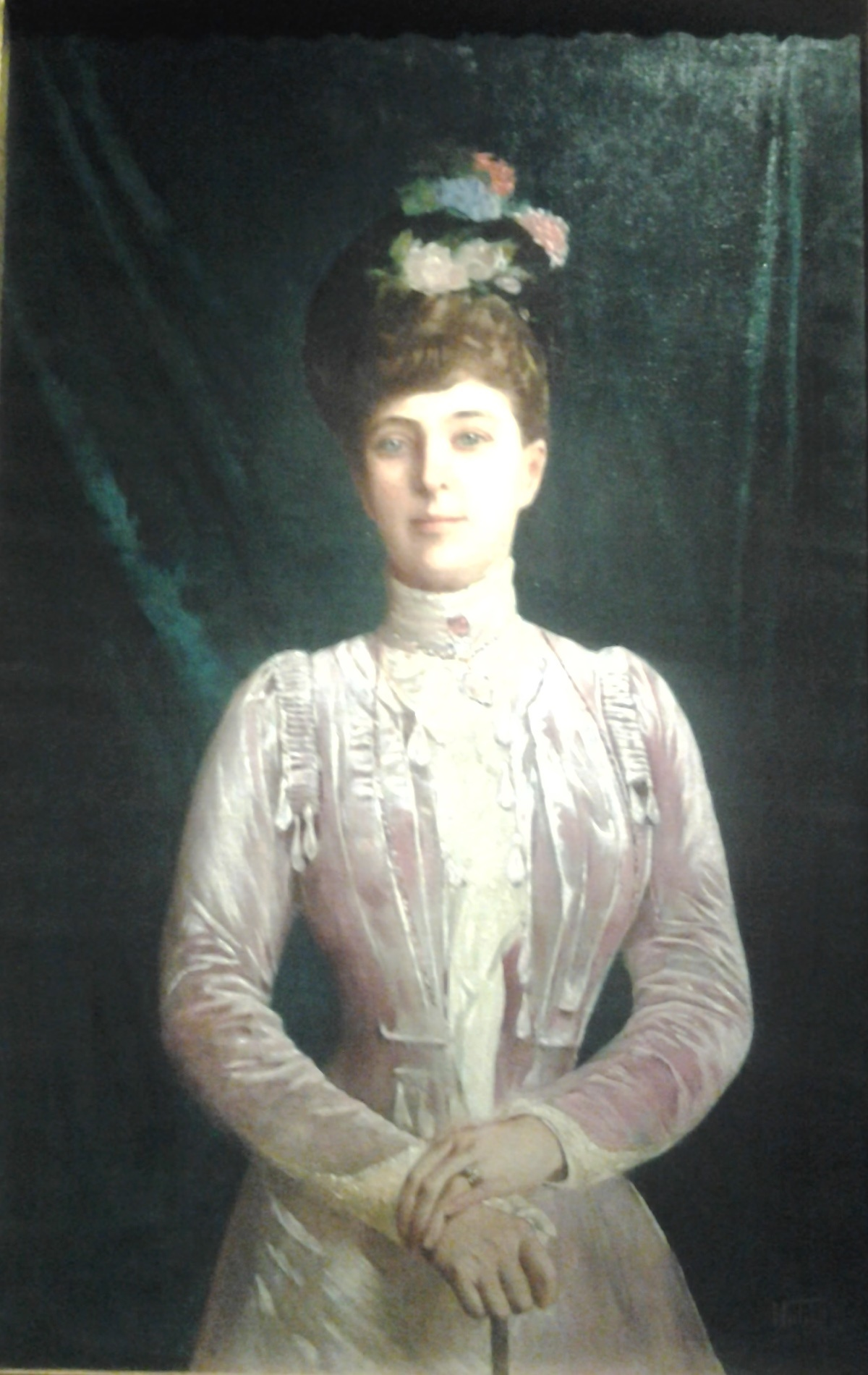
Lady in Pink (1904)

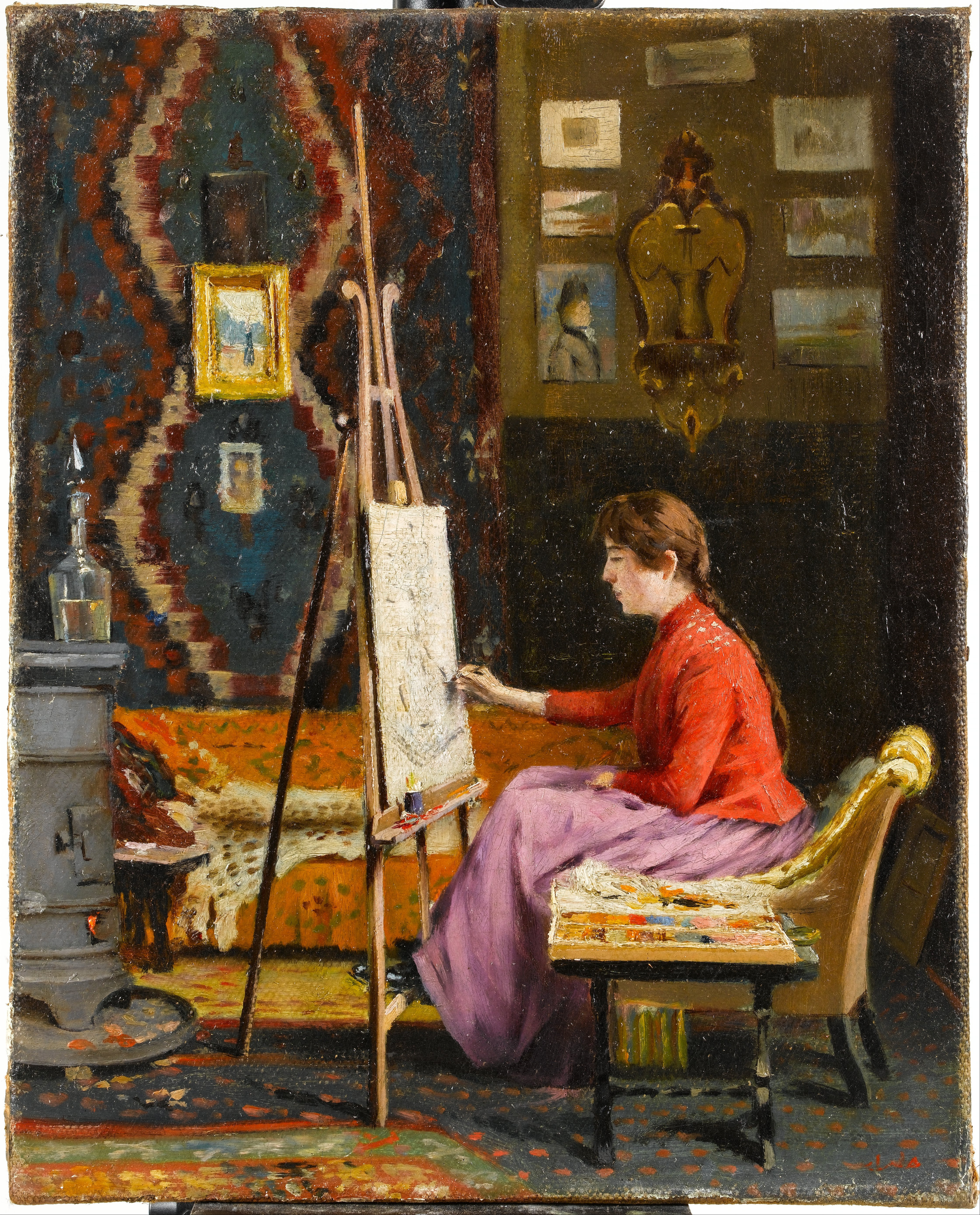
Girl Painter and her Studio (1939)
